= List of women poets =

This is a list of female poets with a Wikipedia page, listed by the period in which they were born.

== Before CE ==
In chronological order:
- Enheduanna (c. 23th century BCE), ancient Sumerian priestess, poet, scribe, and hymnist.
- Ninšatapada (c. 19th c. BCE), Babylonian scribe and priestess
- Lopamudra (c. 15th BCE), Hindu poet
- Bulluṭsa-rabi (13th c. BCE), Babylonian poet
- Deborah (1107–1067 BCE), Israelite prophetess
- Gargi Indian Vedic Hindu poet and writer
- Maitreyi Ancient Hindu lady poet and author
- Sulabha Ancient Hindu lady poet and philosopher
- Sappho (c. 630 – 570 BCE), Greek poet, one of the nine lyric poets
- Myrtis of Anthedon (6th BCE), Greek poet
- Corinna (fl. 6th c. BCE), Greek poet
- Cleobulina (fl. c. 550 BCE), Greek poet
- Telesilla (fl. 510 BCE), Greek poet
- Praxilla (5th c. BCE), Greek poet
- Erinna (fl. 4th c. BCE), Greek poet
- Moero or Myro (3rd c. BCE), Greek poet
- Anyte of Tegea (fl. early 3rd c. BCE), Greek poet
- Aristodama of Smyrna (3rd c. BCE), Ionian poet
- Nossis (fl. c. 300 BCE), Greek epigrammist and poet
- Avvaiyar (c. 3rd c. – 1st c. BCE), Tamil poet
- Zhuo Wenjun (卓文君, 2nd c. BCE), Chinese poet
- Sulpicia (fl. 1st c. BCE), Latin poet
- Cornificia (c. 85 – c. 40 BCE), Roman poet and epigrammist
- Consort Ban (Ban Jieyu, Lady Pan, 班婕妤, c. 48 – c. 6 BCE), Chinese scholar and poet
- Elephantis (fl. late 1st c. BCE), Greek erotic poet

== 1–500 CE ==
In chronological order:
- Sulpicia (fl. 1st c.), Latin poet
- Caecilia Trebulla (fl. c. 130), Latin poet
- Ponmudiyar (between 1st and 4th cc.), Tamil poet
- Julia Balbilla (72 – post–130), Latin poet
- Cai Wenji (蔡琰, died c. 249), Chinese poet and composer
- Afira bint 'Abbad (3rd c.), Arabic poet
- Zuo Fen (左芬, c. 255–300), Chinese poet
- Faltonia Betitia Proba (c. 306/315 – c. 353/366), Roman poet in Latin
- Princess Iwa (磐之媛命, died 347), Japanese poet
- Xie Daoyun (謝道韞, between 340 and 399), Chinese poet
- Su Xiaoxiao (蘇小小, c. 479 – c. 501), Chinese poet and Gējì
- Laila bint Lukaiz (died 483), Arabic poet
- Velliveedhiyar (period unclear), Tamil poet
- al-Fāriʿah bint Shaddād (pre-Islamic), Arabic poet

== 500–999 CE ==
In chronological order:
- Radegund (c. 520–586), Frankish princess and poet in Latin
- al-Khansa (575–645), Arabic poet
- al-Ḥujayjah (Safīyah bint Tha'labah al-Shaybānīyah, 5th – 6th c.), Arabic poet
- al-Ḥurqah (5th – 6th c.), Arabic poet
- Sarah of Yemen (6th c.), Arabic poet
- Hind bint 'Utbah (6th – 7th c.), Arabic poet
- Umm Jamil bint Harb (6th or 7th c.), Arabic poet
- Fatima bint Muhammad (605–632 CE), Arabic poet
- Xu Hui (徐惠, 627–650), Chinese poet
- Nukata no Ōkimi (額田王, fl. 630–690), Japanese poet of the Asuka period
- Empress Jitō (持統天皇, 645–702), Japanese poet and empress
- Jindeok of Silla (진덕여왕, fl. 647–654), Korean poet and queen
- Princess Ōku (大来皇女, 661–702), Japanese poet
- Qutayla ukht al-Nadr (7th c.), Arabic poet
- Maisūn bint Jandal (c. 7th c.), Arabic poet
- Yamato Hime no Ōkimi (倭姫王, later 7th c.), Japanese poet and empress
- Princess Tajima (但馬皇女, died 708), Japanese poet
- Shangguan Wan'er (上官婉兒, c. 664–710), Chinese poet and prose writer
- Laila al-Akhyaliyya (died 694–709), Arabic poet
- Avvaiyar (7th or 8th c.), Tamil poet
- Lubana bint Ali ibn al-Mahdi (c. 8th–9th c.), Arabic poet
- Vijja (8th or 9th c.), Sanskrit poet from India
- Cheng Changwen (程長文, between 7th and 9th cc.), Chinese poet and calligrapher
- Lady Kasa (笠郎女, early 8th c.), Japanese poet
- Ōtomo no Sakanoe no Iratsume (大伴坂上郎女, c. 700–750), Japanese poet
- Raabi'a al-Adwiyya (714–801), Arabic poet
- Xue Tao (薛濤, 768–831), Chinese poet
- 'Ulayya bint al-Mahdi (777–825), Arabic poet
- Laila bint Tarif (died 815), Arabic poet
- Arib al-Ma'muniyya (797–890), Arabic poet
- Shilabhattarika (9th c.), Sanskrit poet from India
- Kassia (810 – pre-865), Byzantine poet and composer writing in Greek
- Shāriyah (c. 815–870), Arabic poet
- Ono no Komachi (小野, c. 825 – c. 900), Japanese waka poet
- Inan (died 841), Arabic poet
- Yu Xuanji (魚玄機, 844–869 or 871), Chinese poet
- Fadl Ashsha'ira (died 871), Arabic poet
- Lady Ise (伊勢, c. 875 – c. 938), Japanese poet
- Shirome (白女, 9th-10th c.), Japanese poet included in the Kokin Wakashu (905)
- Rabia Balkhi (10th c.), Persian poet
- Nakatsukasa (中務, 912–991), Japanese poet
- Kishi Joō (徽子女王, 929–985), Japanese poet
- Hrotsvitha (c. 935 – c. 1002), German dramatist and poet writing in Latin
- Madame Huarui (花蕊夫人, c. 940 - c. 976), Chinese poet
- Akazome Emon (赤染衛門, 956–1041), Japanese poet and historian
- Sei Shōnagon (清少納言, c. 966 – c. 1017), Japanese memoirist and poet
- Murasaki Shikibu (紫式部, 973–1025), Japanese novelist and poet
- Izumi Shikibu (和泉式部, born c. 976), Japanese poet

== 11th–14th centuries ==
In chronological order:
- Ise no Taiu or Taifu (伊勢大輔, early 11th c.), Japanese poet
- Qasmuna bint Isma'il (11th c.), Arabic poet from Al-Andalus
- Wallada bint al-Mustakfi (1001–1080), Andalusian poet writing in Arabic
- Zhu Shuzhen (c. 1135–1180), Chinese poet
- Aa'isha bint Ahmad al-Qurtubiyya (died 1010), Arabic poet from Al-Andalus
- Mariam bint Abu Ya'qub Ashshilbi (died 1020), Arabic poet from Al-Andalus
- Eudokia Makrembolitissa (c. 1021–1096), Byzantine poet and empress writing in Greek
- I'timad Arrumaimikiyya (born 1045/1047), Arabic poet from Al-Andalus
- Umm al-Kiram bin al-Mu'tasim ibn Sumadih (died 1050), Arabic poet from Al-Andalus
- Ava (c. 1060 – 1127), first named female writer in any genre in German
- Buthaina bint al-Mu'tamid ibn Abbad (born 1070), Arabic poet from Al-Andalus
- Li Qingzhao (李清照, 1084 – c. 1151), Chinese writer and poet of the Song dynasty
- Otomae (乙前, c. 1085 – c. 1169), Japanese poet
- Mahsati Ganjavi (c. 1089 – post–1159), Azerbaijani poet
- Muhja bint Attayyani al-Qurtubiyya (died 1097), Arabic poet from Al-Andalus
- Bhavakadevi (fl. 12th c. or earlier), Sanskrit poet from Indian subcontinent
- Safiyya al-Baghdadiyya (12th c.), Arabic poet
- Marie de France (fl. 12th c.), medieval poet, probably born in France and living in England
- Akka Mahadevi (12th c.), Indian poet writing in Old Kannada
- Gangasati (between 12th and 14th cc.), Indian poet and saint
- Taqiyya Umm Ali bint Ghaith ibn Ali al-Armanazi (Sitt al-Ni'm, 1111–1183/1184), Arabic poet
- Tibors de Sarenom (c. 1130 – post–1198), French poet writing in Occitan
- Almucs de Castelnau (c. 1140 – pre–1184), French female troubadour poet
- Comtessa de Dia (fl. c. 1175 or c. 1212), a trobairitz (troubadour), song-writer and poet in Occitan language
- Hafsa bint al-Hajj Arrakuniyya (died 1190), Arabic poet from Al-Andalus
- Avvaiyar (12th c.), Tamil poet
- Marula (fl. 13th c. or earlier), Sanskrit poet from India
- Hadewijch (13th c.), Dutch mystic and poet
- Shikishi Naishinnō (式子内親王, died 1201), Japanese poet
- Hamda bint Ziyad (c. 1204), Arabic poet from Al-Andalus
- Steinvör Sighvatsdóttir (early 13th c. – 1271), Icelandic poet and politician
- Umm Assa'd bint Isam al-Himyari (died 1243), Arabic poet from Al-Andalus
- Padishah Khatun (1256–1295), Persian poet and ruler of Kerman
- Gangadevi (c. 14th c.), Sanskrit poet of the Vijayanagara Empire of India
- Lalleshwari (1320–1392), Indian mystic and poet, earliest works in the Kashmiri language
- Jahan Malek Khatun (1324–1393), Persian poet and princess
- Princess Milica of Serbia (c. 1335–1405), Serbian poet and royal consort
- Christine de Pizan (1364 – c. 1430), Italian, Venetian-born writer and poet

== 15th century ==
In alphabetical order:
- Catherine d'Amboise (1475–1550), French writer and poet
- Vittoria Colonna (1490–1547), Italian poet and marchioness
- Guji, Princess of Joseon (died 1489), Korean writer, poet and dance
- Mihri Hatun (died 1506), female Ottoman Turkish poet
- Huang E (Huang Xiumei, 1498–1569), Chinese poet of Ming dynasty
- Monahinja Jefimija (1350 – after 1405), Serbian poet and nun
- Gwerful Mechain (fl. 1460–1500), Welsh poet
- Mirabai (Meera, Meera Bai) (c. 1498 – c. 1547), Hindu mystical poet
- Teresa of Ávila (St Teresa of Jesus, 1515–1582), Spanish mystic and Catholic saint
- Lucrezia Tornabuoni (1425–1482), Italian poet
- Uhwudong (died 1480), Korean writer, poet and dancer

== 16th century ==
In alphabetical order:
- Maddalena Aceiaiuoli (1557–1610), Tuscan noblewoman and poet
- Rachel Akerman (1522–1544), Austrian Jewish poet writing in German
- Isabella Andreini (1562–1604), Italian playwright, poet and actress
- Anne Askew (1520/1521–1546), English poet and Protestant martyr
- Madeleine de l'Aubespine (1546–1596), French poet
- Gabrielle de Coignard (1550–1586), French poet
- Veronica Franco (1546–1591), Italian poet and courtesan
- Pernette Du Guillet (c. 1520–1545), French poet
- Laura Guidiccioni (1550 – c. 1597/9), Italian noblewoman and poet
- Elen Gwdman (fl. 1609), Welsh poet
- Louise Labé (1524–1566), French poet
- Emilia Lanier (1569–1645), among first Englishwomen to publish a volume of original poems and seek patronage
- Anne Ley (c. 1599–1641), English writer, teacher, and polemicist
- Anne de Marquets (c. 1533–1588), French poet
- Camille de Morel (1547–1611), French poet and writer
- Isabella di Morra (c. 1520–1546), Italian poet of the Petrarchist movement
- Martha Moulsworth (1577–1646), English autobiographical poet
- Cecilia del Nacimiento (1570–1646), Spanish nun, mystic, writer, and poet
- Heo Nanseolheon (1563–1589), Korean female poet of the mid-Joseon dynasty
- Nicoletta Pasquale (fl. 1540), Sicilian Italian poet
- Mary Sidney, Countess of Pembroke (1561–1621), among first Englishwomen to gain a literary reputation
- Gaspara Stampa (1523–1554), Italian poet
- Joana Vaz (c. 1500 – post–1570), Portuguese court poet and humanist
- Isabella Whitney (fl. 1567–1573), earliest identified woman to publish secular poetry in English
- Lady Mary Wroth (1587–1651/1653), prolific English author

== 17th century ==
In alphabetical order:
- Gertrudis Anglesola (1641–1727), Valencian Cistercian abbess, mystic, autobiographer, spiritual poet
- Mary Barber (1685–1755), Irish poet, member of Swift's circle
- Aphra Behn (1640–1689), dramatist of the English Restoration and was one of the first English professional female writers
- Anne Bradstreet (c. 1612–1672), New England's first published poet
- Sophia Elisabet Brenner (1659–1730), Swedish writer, poet, feminist and salon hostess
- Charlotte-Rose de Caumont de La Force (1654–1724), French novelist and poet
- Jane Cavendish (1620/1621–1669), English poet and playwright
- Margaret Cavendish, Duchess of Newcastle-upon-Tyne (1623–1673), English aristocrat, prolific writer, and scientist
- Susannah Centlivre (1667–1723), English playwright and poet
- Lady Mary Chudleigh (1656–1710), English poet, essayist and writer
- Mary Collier (c. 1688–1762), English poet
- Juana Inés de la Cruz (1648–1695), Mexican poet, musician and nun, self-taught scholar and poet of Baroque school
- Sarah Dixon (1671–1765), English poet
- Elżbieta Drużbacka (1695 or 1698–1765), Polish poet
- Dorothe Engelbretsdotter (1634–1716), Norway's first recognized female author
- Anne Finch, Countess of Winchilsea (1661–1720), English poet
- Catharina Regina von Greiffenberg (1633–1694), Austrian poet
- Eliza Haywood (1693–1756), English novelist, playwright, essayist, poet and translator
- Anne Killigrew (1660–1685), English poet
- Amalia Wilhelmina Königsmarck (1663–1740), Swedish noble, dilettante painter, actor and poet
- Žofia Kubini (fl. mid–17th c.), Hungarian poet writing in Czech
- Anne Ley (c. 1599–1641), English writer, teacher, and polemicist
- Antoinette du Ligier de la Garde Deshoulières (1638–1694), French poet
- Lady Mary Wortley Montagu (1689–1762), English aristocrat and writer
- Julia Palmer (fl.1664–1673), English dissenting poet
- Kata Szidónia Petrőczy (1659–1708), Hungarian poet and writer
- Katherine Philips (1631–1664), English poet
- Vendela Skytte (1608–1629), Swedish noblewoman, salonnière, writer, poet and lady of letters
- Anna Stanisławska (1651–1701), Polish poet and author
- Nāzo Tokhī (1651–1717), Afghan poet and writer
- Anne Wharton (1659–1685), English poet
- Jane Wiseman (c. 1682–1717), English poet and playwright
- Zeb-un-Nissa (1638–1702), Persian-language poet and Mughal Princess
- Aurelia Zwartte (bap. 1682), Dutch poet

== 18th century ==
In alphabetical order:
- Jean Adam (Adams, 1704–1765), Scottish poet and teacher
- Nana Asma'u (1793–1864), Fulani poet and pioneer of women's education in Sokoto Caliphate
- Mah Laqa Bai (1768–1824), Urdu poet and philanthropist
- Anna Laetitia Barbauld (1743–1825), English poet, essayist, literary critic and children's author
- Margaret Bingham (1740–1814), English poet and painter
- Susanna Blamire (1747–1794), English poet
- Ann Eliza Bleecker (1752–1783), American poet and correspondent
- Martha Wadsworth Brewster (1710 – c. 1757), American poet and writer; first American-born woman to publish in own name
- Magdalene Sophie Buchholm (1758–1825), Norwegian poet
- Anna Bunina (1774–1829), Russian poet
- Sophia Burrell (1753–1802), English poet and dramatist
- Charlotte Bourette (1714–1784) French poet and lemonade seller
- Elizabeth Carter (1717–1806), English poet, writer and Bluestocking
- Christina Charlotta Cederström (1760–1832), Swedish artist, salon hostess and baroness
- Helmina von Chézy (1783–1856), German poet, playwright and librettist
- Fukuda Chiyo-ni (福田千代尼, 1703–1775), Japanese haiku poet
- Alison Cockburn (1712–1794), Scottish poet and socialite
- Caroline de Crespigny (1797–1861), English poet and translator
- Ann Batten Cristall (1769–1848), English poet and schoolteacher
- Umihana Čuvidina (c. 1794 – c. 1870), Bosnian poet
- Fanny Dénoix des Vergnes (1798–1879), French poet and writer
- Marceline Desbordes-Valmore (1786–1859), French poet
- Annette von Droste-Hülshoff (1797–1848), German poet
- Emily Eden (1797–1869), English novelist and poet
- Anna Ehrenström (1786–1857), Swedish poet
- Ema Saiko (1787-1861), Japanese bamboo painter, kanshi poet, and calligrapher
- Catherine Maria Fanshawe (1765–1834), English poet
- Margaretta Faugères (1771–1801), American poet
- Jane Lewers Gray (1796–1871), Northern Ireland-born American poet and hymnwriter
- Ann Griffiths (1776–1805), Welsh poet and hymnist
- Karoline von Günderrode (1780–1806), German poet
- Hara Saihin (1798-1859), Japanese kanshi poet and Confucian scholar
- Felicia Hemans (1793–1835), English poet
- Luise Hensel (1798–1876), German religious writer and poet
- Hồ Xuân Hương (1772–1822), Vietnamese poet
- Barbara Hofland (1770–1844), English children's writer and poet
- Margaret Holford (1778–1852), English poet and translator
- Mary Howitt (1799–1888), English poet and children's writer
- Abby B. Hyde (1799–1872), American hymnwriter
- Anna Louisa Karsch (1722–1791), German poet and letter writer
- Isabella Kelly (1759–1857), Scottish poet and novelist
- Mary Leapor (1722–1746), English poet
- Anne Brydges Lefroy (1747/8–1804), English writer and poet
- Anna Maria Lenngren (1754–1817), Swedish writer, poet, feminist, translator and salonnière
- Charlotte Lennox (c. 1730–1804), English novelist, poet and dramatist
- Isabella Lickbarrow (1784–1847), English poet
- Erika Liebman (1738–1803), Swedish poet and academic
- Charlotta Löfgren (1720–1784), Swedish poet
- Hedvig Löfwenskiöld (1736–1789), Swedish poet
- Jetske Reinou van der Malen (1681–1752), Dutch poet
- Sophie Mereau (1770–1806), German novelist and poet
- Hannah More (1745–1833), English religious writer and philanthropist
- Hedvig Charlotta Nordenflycht (1718–1763), Swedish poet, feminist and salonnière
- Julia Nyberg (1784–1854), Swedish poet and songwriter
- Mathilda d'Orozco (Mathilda Montgomery-Cederhjelm, 1796–1863), Swedish salonnière, poet, writer, composer and harpsichordist
- Ōtagaki Rengetsu (1791–1875), Japanese poet, calligrapher and actress
- Isabel Pagan (c. 1740–1821), Scottish poet
- Anna Maria Porter (1780–1832), English poet and novelist
- Elisa von der Recke (Elisabeth Recke, 1754–1833), German writer and poet from Courland
- Emma Roberts (1794–1840), English poet and travel writer
- Mary Robinson (1757–1800), English poet and novelist
- Mary Rolls (1775–1835), English poet
- Susanna Rowson (1762–1824), British-American novelist, poet and playwright
- Esther Saunders (1793–1862), African American poet who escaped from slavery
- Anna Seward (1747–1809), English poet
- Lydia Sigourney (1791-1865), American poet and author of conduct literature
- Hedvig Sirenia (1734–1795), Swedish poet
- Charlotte Smith (1749–1806), English Romantic poet and novelist
- Caroline Anne Southey (1786–1854), English poet
- Agnes Strickland (1796–1874), English history writer and poet
- Judit Dukai Takách (1795–1836), Hungarian poet
- Amable Tastu (1795–1885), French poet and writer
- Ann Taylor (1782–1866), English poet and critic
- Emily Taylor (1795–1872), English poet and children's writer
- Jane Taylor (1783–1824), English poet and novelist
- Lucy Terry (c. 1730–1821), American poet
- Elizabeth Thomas (1770/1771–1855), English novelist and poet
- Petronella Johanna de Timmerman (1723–1786), Dutch poet and scientist
- Queen Tripurasundari of Nepal (1794–1832), Nepalese poet and regent
- Katharine Augusta Ware (1797–1813), American poet and literary magazine editor
- Jane West (1758–1852), English novelist, poet, playwright and tractarian
- Mary Whateley (1738–1825), English poet and playwright
- Phillis Wheatley (1753–1784), first African-American to publish a book of poetry
- Ulrika Widström (1764–1841), Swedish poet and translator
- Helen Maria Williams (1762–1827), English novelist and poet
- Maria Petronella Woesthoven (1760–1830), Dutch poet
- Dorothy Wordsworth (1771–1855), English poet and diarist
- Ann Yearsley (1753–1806), English poet, novelist and playwright
- Wu Zao (1799–1862), Chinese poet
- Maria van Zuylekom (1759–1831), Dutch poet and author

== 19th-century (date of birth unknown) ==
- Cornelia Laws St. John (died February 24, 1902), American poet and biographer

== 1800s ==
In alphabetical order:
- Emily Bowes (1806–1857), prominent Brethren author, religious tract writer and poet
- Elizabeth Barrett Browning (1806–1861), prominent English poet
- Elizabeth Duncan Campbell (1804–1878), Scottish working class poet and autobiographical writer
- Elizabeth Margaret Chandler (1807–1834), American poet and writer, first American woman writer to make abolition of slavery her main theme
- Lydia Maria Child (1802–1880), American poet, novelist and journalist
- Caroline Clive (1801–1872), English poet and novelist
- Lucretia Maria Davidson (1808–1825), American poet
- Julia Anne Elliott (1809–1841), English poet and hymnwriter
- Marjorie (Marjory) Fleming (1803–1811), Scottish child diarist and poet
- Frances Dana Barker Gage (1808–1884), American writer, poet, reformer, feminist and abolitionist
- Léocadie Hersent-Penquer (1817–1889), French poet
- Letitia Elizabeth Landon (L. E. L., 1802–1838), English poet and novelist
- Hermance Lesguillon (1800-1882), French poet and novelist
- Élisa Mercœur (1809-1835), French poet, writer, and essayist
- Susanna Moodie (1803–1885), Canadian diarist, novelist, children's novelist and poet
- Caroline Norton (1808–1877), English poet, novelist and political writer
- Jane Johnston Schoolcraft (1800–1842), American Indian writer of poetry and fiction

== 1810s ==
In alphabetical order:
- Maria Frances Anderson (1819–1895), French-born American writer of prose and hymns
- Agnieszka Baranowska (1819–1890), Polish playwright and poet
- Adélaïde-Louise d'Eckmühl de Blocqueville (1815–1892), French poet and woman of letters
- Anne Lynch Botta (1815–1891), American poet, writer, teacher and socialite
- Charlotte Brontë (1816–1855), English novelist and poet, eldest of three Brontë writers
- Emily Brontë (1818–1848), English novelist and poet, best remembered for her novel Wuthering Heights
- Frances Browne (1816–1887), Irish poet and novelist
- Eliza Cook (1818–1889), English poet
- Elizabeth Jessup Eames (1813–1856), American writer of prose and poetry
- George Eliot (born Marian Evans, 1819–1880), English novelist and poet
- Elizabeth F. Ellet (1818–1877), American writer, historian and poet
- Catharine H. Esling (1812–1897), American author, poet, hymn writer
- Gertrudis Gomez de Avellaneda (1814–1873), Cuban novelist, playwright and poet
- Ellen Sturgis Hooper (1812–1848), American poet, member of Transcendental Club
- Julia Ward Howe (1819–1910), American abolitionist, social activist, and poet, author of "The Battle Hymn of the Republic"
- Jane Hughes (1811–1880), Welsh religious poet
- Marguerite St. Leon Loud (1812–1889), American poet and writer
- Dada Masiti (c. 1810s–1919), Somalian poet and scholar
- Élise Moreau (1813-1876), French poet
- Mary Rootes Thornton McAboy (1815–1892), American poet
- Charlotta Öberg (Lotta Öberg, 1818–1856), Swedish poet
- Táhirih (1814 or 1817–1852), Iranian poet and theologian
- Narcyza Żmichowska (1818–1876), Polish novelist and poet

== 1820s ==
In alphabetical order:
- Louise Esther Vickroy Boyd (1827–1909), American poet
- Anne Brontë (1820–1849), English novelist and poet, youngest of three Brontë writers
- Alice Cary (1820–1871), American poet, sister of Phoebe Cary
- Anna Olcott Commelin (1841–1924), American writer and poet
- Julia Pleasants Creswell (1827–1886), American poet, novelist
- Anne Evans (1820–1870), English poet and composer
- Teréz Ferenczy (1823–1853), Hungarian poet
- Dora Greenwell (1821–1882), English poet
- Frances Harper (1825–1911), American poet and novelist
- Maria Ilnicka (1825 or 1827–1897), Polish poet, novelist and translator
- Jean Ingelow (1820–1897), English poet and novelist
- Annie Keary (1825–1879), English novelist and poet
- Lucy Larcom (1824–1893), American mill girl, contributor to Lowell Offering, publishing four books of poetry
- Maria White Lowell (1821–1853), American poet and abolitionist
- Eliza F. Morris (1821–1874), English hymnwriter
- Milica Stojadinović-Srpkinja (1828–1878), Serbian poet
- Emma Tatham (1829–1855), English poet widely admired in her century
- Kutty Kunju Thankachi (1820–1904), Indian poet, writer and composer
- M. B. M. Toland (1925-1895), American poet and social leader
- Charlotte Maria Tucker (1821–1893), English poet and writer
- Mary Ware (1828–1915), American poet, prose writer
- Jane Wilde (1821–1896), Irish poet and nationalist
- Ruth Wills (1826–1908), English poet

== 1830s ==
In alphabetical order:
- Brígida Agüero (1837–1866), Cuban poet
- Louisa May Alcott (1832–1888), American novelist, playwright and poet
- Elizabeth Akers Allen (1832–1911), American poet and journalist
- Ellen Palmer Allerton (1835–1893), American poet
- Marcelina Almeida (c. 1830–1880), Argentine-born Uruguayan writer, novelist and poet
- Addie L. Ballou (1837–1916), American poet and suffragist
- Hester A. Benedict (1838–1921), American poet and writer
- Annie R. Blount (1839–unknown), American poet, short story writer, and newspaper editor
- Carrie Carlton (1834–1868), American poet, writer, and journalist
- Rosalía de Castro (1837–1885), Spanish and Galician Romantic writer and poet
- Úrsula Céspedes (1832–1874), Cuban poet
- Emelie C. S. Chilton (1838–1864), American poet, short story writer, editor
- Annie McCarer Darlington (1836–1907), American poet
- Amelia Denis de Icaza (1836–1911), Panamanian poet
- Emily Dickinson (1830–1886), American
- Phebe Cobb Larry Dole (1835-1909), American poet and artist
- E. S. Elliott (1836–1897), English, poet, hymnwriter, novelist, editor
- Amélie Gex (1835–1883), French poet and writer in French and Franco-Provençal
- Charlotte Forten Grimké (1837–1914), African-American abolitionist, poet and educator
- Bertha Jane Grundy (1837–1912), English poet and novelist
- Grace Hibbard (c. 1835–1911), American author, poet
- Mary E. Ireland (1834–1927), American; "poetess of Cecil County"
- Luzmaría Jiménez Faro (1937-2015), Spanish writer, essayist, anthologist, poet, and editor
- Amanda Jones (1835–1914), American poet, inventor and spiritualist
- Atala Kisfaludy (1836–1911), Hungarian poet and writer
- Elizabeth Harcourt Mitchell (1833–1910), English poet
- Julia Pérez Montes de Oca (1839–1875), Cuban poet
- Carlotta Perry (1839/1848–1914), American writer and poet
- Sarah Jane Rees (1839–1916), Welsh poet
- Mary Bynon Reese (1832–1908), American temperance leader, poet, hymnwriter
- Christina Rossetti (1830–1894), English poet writing romantic, devotional and children's poems
- Ellen Sergeant Rude (1838–1916), American poet, writer, and temperance reformer
- Virginie Sampeur (1939–1919), Haitian educator and poet
- Carrie Bell Sinclair (1839–1883), American poet
- María del Pilar Sinués de Marco (1835–1893), Spanish novelist, poet, non-fiction writer
- Staka Skenderova (1831–1891), Bosnian poet, teacher and social worker
- Jeanie Oliver Davidson Smith (1836–1925), American poet and romance writer
- Amelia Solar de Claro (1836–1915), Chilean poet, playwright, and essayist
- Harriet Elizabeth Prescott Spofford (1835–1921), American mystery novelist, poet and short story writer
- Celia Thaxter (1835–1894), American writer of poetry and stories
- Lydia H. Tilton (1839–1915), American journalist, poet, lyricist
- Mary Frances Tyler Tucker (1837–1902), American poet
- Emma Rood Tuttle (1839–1916), American writer and poet
- Sarah Lowe Twiggs (1839–1920), American poet
- Marion E. Warner (1839–1918), American poet and short story writer
- Jeneverah M. Winton (1837–1904), American poet and author
- Khurshidbanu Natavan (1832–1897), Azerbaijani poet and philanthropist

== 1840s ==
In alphabetical order:
- Lizzie Berry (1847-1919), British poet
- Lettie S. Bigelow (1849–1906), American poet and author
- Carmen Blanco y Trigueros (ca. 1840 - 1921), Spanish poet, writer, journalist
- Mathilde Blind (1841–1896), German-born English poet
- Alice Williams Brotherton (1848–1930), American poet, lyricist, and author
- Maria Alinda Bonacci Brunamonti (1841–1903), Italian poet and scholar
- Marietta Stanley Case (1845–1900), American poet and temperance advocate
- Ellen Melicent Cobden (1848–1914), British writer, radical campaigner and suffragist
- Ina Coolbrith (born Josephine Anna Smith) (1841–1928), first American poet laureate and first public librarian of California
- Elizabeth Dayton (1848-1924), American author and poet
- Sarah Doudney (1841–1926), English poet, hymnist and fiction writer
- Marian Douglas (1842–1913), American poet and short story writer
- Myra Douglas (1844 – unknown death date), American writer, poet
- Angeline Fuller Fischer (1841–1925), American writer, poet
- Lisa Anne Fletcher (1844–1905), American poet, correspondent
- Blanca de Gassó y Ortiz (1846–1877), Spanish writer and poet
- Annie Somers Gilchrist (1841–1912), American poet, novelist, biographer
- Isadore Gilbert Jeffery (1840–1919), American poet, lyricist
- Maria Konopnicka (1842–1910), Polish novelist, poet, translator and essayist
- Emily Lawless (1845–1913), Irish novelist and poet
- Louisa Lawson (1848–1920), Australian poet, writer and feminist
- Emma Lazarus (1849–1887), American poet, best known for "The New Colossus" (inscribed on the Statue of Liberty)
- Manuela Antonia Márquez García-Saavedra (1844–1890), Peruvian writer, poet, composer, pianist
- Dr. Lucy Creemer Peckham (1842–1923), American physician, poet
- Alice E. Heckler Peters (1845–1921), American social reformer, educator, poet, writer
- Emily Browne Powell (1847-1938), American writer, poet; president, Pacific Coast Women's Press Association
- Kate Brownlee Sherwood (1841–1914), American poet, journalist, translator and story writer
- Angeline Teal (1842-1913), American poet, novelist, short story writer
- Julia H. Thayer (1847-1944), American poet, hymnwriter, and educator
- Beatrix Lucia Catherine Tollemache (1840–1926), British poet and translator
- Ellen Oliver Van Fleet (1842–1893), American poet and hymnwriter
- Sallie Ada Vance (ca. 1840 – unknown)
- Adelaide Cilley Waldron (1843–1909), American author, editor, clubwoman
- Sarah Stokes Walton (1844–1899), American poet and artist
- Laura Rosamond White (1844–1922), American poet, author, editor

== 1850s ==
In alphabetical order:
- Annie Wall Barnett (1859–1942), American writer, litterateur, poet
- Katharine Lee Bates (1859–1929), American songwriter
- Marion Babcock Baxter (1850–1910), American poet, lecturer and financial agent
- Eva Best (1851–1925), American story writer, poet, music composer, dramatist
- Anna Braden (1858–1939), American poet, author, editor
- Florence Earle Coates (1850–1927), American poet
- Alice Rollit Coe (1858–1940), Canadian-American author
- Helen Gray Cone (1859–1934), American poet and professor of English literature
- Dolores Correa Zapata (1853–1924), Mexican teacher, writer, poet, and advocate for women's rights
- Isabella Valancy Crawford (1850–1887), Canadian poet
- Anne Virginia Culbertson (1857–1918), American poet, writer
- Miriam Del Banco (1858–1931), American poet
- Prasannamoyee Devi (1856–1939), Bengali poet, travel writer and memoirist
- Belle R. Harrison (1856–1940), American poet and short story writer
- Veronica Micle (1850–1889), Romanian poet and writer
- Nicolasa Montt (1857–1924), Chilean poet
- Constance Naden (1858–1889), English poet and philosopher
- Charlotte Niese (1854–1935), German writer and poet
- Amy Parkinson (1855–1938), English-born Canadian poet
- Adelaide Day Rollston (1854–1941), American poet and author
- Francisca Sarasate (1853-1922), Spanish poet and author
- Mary Stebbins Savage (1850-1915), American poet and author
- Salomé Ureña de Henríquez (1850–1897), Dominican Republic poet and pioneer of women's education
- Minnie Gow Walsworth (1859–1947), American poet
- Ella Wheeler Wilcox (1850–1919), American author and poet

== 1860s ==
In alphabetical order
- Brígida Agüero (1837–1866), Cuban poet
- Anne Reeve Aldrich (1866–1892), American poet and novelist
- Marion Angus (1865–1946), Scottish poet writing in Scots and standard English
- Virginia Frazer Boyle (1863–1938), American poet and author
- Mae Bramhall (c. 1861–1897), American actress, writer
- Eve Brodlique (1867–1949), British-born Canadian/American author, poet, journalist
- Olivia Ward Bush (1869–1944), American author, poet and journalist
- Mary Elizabeth Coleridge (1861–1907), English novelist, poet, essayist and critic
- Marguerite Coppin (1867–1931), Poet Laureate of Belgium
- Jelena Dimitrijević (1862–1945), Serbian poet, fiction writer and polyglot
- Alice May Douglas (1865–1943), American poet and children's writer
- Helen Merrill Egerton (1866–1951), Canadian poet and historical writer
- Mary Eliza Fullerton (1868–1946), Australian feminist poet, fiction writer and journalist
- Charlotte Perkins Gilman (1860–1935), American sociologist, author, poet and lecturer for social reform
- Mary Gilmore (1865–1962), Australian socialist poet and journalist
- Zinaida Gippius (1869–1945), Russian/Italian poet, novelist and dramatist
- Anna Haava (1864–1957), Estonian poet
- Alice Harriman (1861–1925), American poet, author and publisher
- Josephine D. Heard (1861 – c. 1921), American teacher, poet
- Ricarda Huch (1864–1947), German historian, novelist and poet
- Violet Jacob (1863–1946), Scottish poet writing in Scots
- E. Pauline Johnson (1861–1913), Canadian poet
- Sallie M. Mills Johnson (1862-1927), American author and poet
- Magdalene Isadora La Grange (1864–1935), American poet
- Else Lasker-Schüler (1869–1945), German poet and playwright
- Mirra Lokhvitskaya (1869–1905), Russian poet
- Elizabeth Roberts MacDonald (1864–1922), Canadian poet and writer
- Clementina Laura Majocchi (1866–1945), Italian poet and writer
- Emily Julian McManus (1865–1918), Canadian poet, author, and educator
- Charlotte Mew (1869–1928), English poet
- Harriet Monroe (1860–1936), American poet, critic and arts patron
- Yogmaya Neupane (1867–1941), Nepalese poet and religious leader
- Violet Nicholson (Laurence Hope, 1865–1904), English poet
- Morilla M. Norton (1865-1916), American author, poet
- Amber E. Robinson (1867-1961), American educator, postmaster, poet, reporter, social reformer
- Ethel Rolt-Wheeler (1869–1958), English poet, author and journalist
- Fannie Isabelle Sherrick (fl. 1860 – 1880), American poet, essayist, and columnist
- Hilda Siller (1861–1945), American poet and short story writer
- May Sinclair (1862–1946), English fiction writer and poet
- Dorothy Sproule (1867-1963), Canadian poet
- Fruzina Szalay (1864–1926), Hungarian poet and translator
- Violet Tweedale (1862–1936), Scottish writer and poet
- Madge Morris Wagner (1862–1924), American poet, journalist, novelist, editor

== 1870s ==
In alphabetical order:
- Eleanor Hallowell Abbott (1872–1958), American poet, novelist and short story writer
- Pauline B. Barrington (1876–1956), American poet
- Lucie Delarue-Mardrus (1874–1945), French poet, novelist and journalist
- Alice Dunbar-Nelson (1875–1935), American poet, journalist and political activist
- Nicole Garay (1873–1928), Panamanian poet
- Norah M. Holland (1876–1925), poet, playwright, journalist and editor
- Annie Campbell Huestis (1878–1960), Canadian poet
- Georgia Douglas Johnson (1877–1966), American poet
- Gertrud von Le Fort (1876–1971), German novelist, poet and essayist
- Mary Sinton Leitch (1876-1954),

American poet, founded the Poetry Society of Virginia

- Lilian Leveridge (1879–1953), Canadian poet, short story writer, and non-fiction writer
- Amy Lowell (1874–1925), American poet of Imagist school, posthumous Pulitzer Prize for Poetry winner in 1926
- Agnes Miegel (1879–1964), German journalist, writer and poet
- Alice Duer Miller (1874–1942), American poet, novelist and screenplay writer
- Nellie Burget Miller (1875-1952), American poet, non-fiction writer, dramatist
- L. M. Montgomery (1874–1942), Canadian poet and children's author
- Sarojini Naidu (Nightingale of India, 1879–1949), child prodigy, Indian independence activist and poet
- Qiu Jin (1875–1907), Chinese revolutionary, feminist and writer
- Hélène Picard (1873-1945), French poet
- Dorothy Richardson (1873–1957), English fiction writer, poet and essayist
- Lola Ridge (1873–1941), American anarchist poet and editor of avant-garde, feminist and Marxist publications
- Mary Roberts Rinehart (1876–1958), American novelist, playwright, and poet
- Nina Salaman (1877–1925), English poet and translator
- Dora Adele Shoemaker (1873–1962), American poet and playwright
- Leonora Speyer (1872–1956), American poet and violinist
- Ilse von Stach (1879–1941), German playwright, novelist and poet
- Gertrude Stein (1874–1946), American writer, poet and art collector spending most of her life in France
- Lesya Ukrainka (1871–1913), Ukrainian poet
- Renée Vivien (1877–1909), French poet
- Florence Mary Wilson (c. 1870–1946), Northern Irish poet
- Maryla Wolska (1873–1930), Polish poet
- Yosano Akiko (與謝野晶子, 1878–1942), Japanese poet and feminist
- Kazimiera Zawistowska (1870–1902), Polish poet and translator

== 1880s ==
In alphabetical order:
- Delmira Agustini (1886–1914), Uruguayan poet
- Anna Akhmatova (1889–1966), Russian and Soviet modernist poet
- Ethel Anderson (1883–1958), Australian poet, essayist, novelist and painter
- Berthe Bénichou-Aboulker (1888–1942), French Algerian poet and playwright
- Grace Stone Coates (1881–1976), American poet and fiction writer
- Frances Cornford (1886–1960), English poet
- Helen Cruickshank (1886–1975), Scottish poet writing in Braid Scots and English
- H.D. (Hilda Doolittle) (1886–1961), American poet, novelist and memoirist, known for Imagist poetry
- Cherubina de Gabriak (Elisaveta Ivanovna Dmitrieva, 1887–1928), Russian poet
- Elizabeth Daryush (1887–1977), English poet
- Enid Derham (1882–1941), Australian poet
- Zoraida Díaz (1991–1948) Panamanian poet and feminist
- Eleanor Farjeon (1881–1965), English poet and children's writer
- Jesse Redmon Fauset (1882–1961), American poet, essayist and novelist
- Else Feldmann (1884–1942), Austrian playwright, poet and novelist
- Scottie McKenzie Frasier (1884–1964), American poet
- Pauline Fréchette (1889–1943), French Canadian poet, dramatist, journalist, and Catholic nun
- Ethel Romig Fuller (1883–1965), American poet and Oregon's third Poet Laureate
- Angelina Weld Grimké (1880–1958), Mixed American journalist, teacher, playwright and poet
- Anna Augusta Von Helmholtz-Phelan (1890–1964), American professor, poet, non-fiction writer
- Anna Minerva Henderson, Canadian teacher, civil servant, and poet
- Emmy Hennings (1885–1948), German poet and performer
- Juana Teresa Juega López (1885–1979), Galician-language Spanish poet
- Margit Kaffka (1880–1918), Hungarian poet and writer
- Mina Loy (1882–1966), Anglo-American artist, poet, playwright and novelist
- Marie Le Franc (1879-1964), French poet, novelist, and essayist
- Ruth Manning-Sanders (1886–1988), English poet and author best known for a series of children's books
- Anna Margolin (1887–1952), Russian-American Yiddish-language poet
- Iskouhi Minas (1885-1951), French poet of Armenian origin
- Gabriela Mistral (Lucila Godoy Alcayaga) (1889–1957), Chilean poet, educator, diplomat, and feminist, first Latin American to win Nobel Prize in Literature
- Marianne Moore (1887–1972), American Modernist poet and writer
- Nettie Palmer (1885–1964), Australian poet, essayist and literary critic
- Sylvia Pankhurst (1882–1960), English suffragist, and poet, wrote Writ on Cold Slate (1922) on prison experiences
- Sophia Parnok (1885–1933), Russian Jewish Silver Age poet
- Marguerite Helen Power (1870–1957), Australian poet
- Paula von Preradović (1887–1951), Austrian story writer and poet
- Beatrice Redpath (1886–1937), Canadian poet and short story writer
- María Herminia Sabbia y Oribe (1883–1961), Uruguayan poet
- Blanaid Salkeld (1880–1959), Irish poet, dramatist, actor and salonnière
- Fredegond Shove (1889–1949), English poet
- Edith Sitwell (1887–1964), English poet and critic, eldest of three literary Sitwells
- Anne Spencer (1882–1975), American poet
- Elkanah East Taylor (1888–1945), American poet; poetry magazine founder
- Sara Teasdale (1884–1933), American lyrical poet
- Francesca Torrent (1881-1958), Spanish writer, poet
- Regina Ullmann (1884–1961), Swiss poet writing in German
- Dorothy Wellesley, Duchess of Wellington (1889–1956), English poet
- Anna Wickham, born Edith Alice Mary Harper (1884–1947), English poet with Australian connections
- Elinor Wylie (1885–1928), American poet and novelist

== 1890s ==
In alphabetical order:
- Léonie Adams (1899–1988), American poet, seventh United States Poet Laureate
- Elisaveta Bagryana (1893–1991), Bulgarian poet known as a mother of Bulgarian literature
- Grace Shattuck Bail (1898–1996), American poet and composer
- Djuna Barnes (1892–1982), American modernist lesbian writer
- Ameena Begum (1892–1949), Indian/French poet
- Louise Bogan (1897–1970), American poet; fourth US Poet Laureate
- Marianne Bruns (1897–1994), German poet and novelist
- Bryher (Annie Winifred Ellerman, 1894–1983), English novelist, poet, memoirist, and magazine editor
- Lydia Cabrera (1899–1991), Cuban poet and anthropologist
- May Wedderburn Cannan (1893–1973), English poet
- María Cegarra Salcedo (1899–1993), Spanish chemist, teacher, poet, councillor
- Amy Key Clarke (1892–1980), English mystical poet, author and teacher
- Dulcie Deamer (1890–1972), New Zealand-born Australian poet and novelist
- Babette Deutsch (1895–1982), American poet, critic, translator, and novelist
- Florbela Espanca (1894–1930), Portuguese poet
- Maria Grabher-Meyer (1898–1970), Liechtensteiner poet and short story writer
- Claire Goll (1890–1977), German-born poet and novelist writing in German and French
- Dharmachari Guruma (1898–1978), Nepalese hymnist and Buddhist nun
- Gelanesh Haddis (1896–1986), Ethiopian poet and church scholar
- Hilda Mary Hooke (1898–1978), Canadian poet, playwright
- Shizue Iwatsuki (1897–1984), American poet
- Ethel Jacobson (1899–1991), American writer of light verse
- Edna Jaques (1891–1978), Canadian poet
- Gertrud Kolmar (1894–1943), German poet
- Helen von Kolnitz Hyer (1896–1983), American poet, writer; South Carolina Poet Laureate 1974–1983
- Elisabeth Langgässer (1899–1950), German poet and novelist
- Claudia Lars (1899–1974), Salvadoran poet
- Muna Lee (1895–1965), American poet and translator
- Edith Gyömrői Ludowyk (1896–1987), Hungarian/Sri Lankan poet and psychotherapist
- Desanka Maksimović (1898–1993), Serbian poet, writer and translator
- Edna St. Vincent Millay (1892–1950), American lyrical poet, playwright and feminist
- Naomi Mitchison (1897–1999), Scottish novelist and poet
- Helene Mullins (1899–1991), American poet and novelist
- María Olimpia de Obaldía (1891–1985), Panamanian poet
- Mary Devenport O'Neill (1898–1957), Irish poet and dramatist
- Ida Ospelt-Amann (1899–1996), Liechtensteiner dialect poet
- Dorothy Parker (1893–1967), American poet, short story writer, critic and satirist
- Maria Pawlikowska-Jasnorzewska (1891–1945), Polish poet
- Ruth Pitter (1897–1992), English poet, first woman to receive Queen's Gold Medal for Poetry, in 1955
- Esther Raab (1894–1981), Palestinian/Israeli poet and prose writer
- Elsa Rautee (1897–1987), Finnish poet
- Nelly Sachs (1891–1970), Jewish German poet and playwright
- Vita Sackville-West (1892–1962), English writer, poet and gardener
- Nafija Sarajlić (1893–1970), Bosnian poet and prose writer
- Henriette Sauret (1890–1976), French poet and political writer
- Nan Shepherd (1893–1981), Scottish novelist and poet
- Maria Shkapskaya (1891–1952), Soviet poet and journalist
- Edith Södergran (1892–1923), Swedish-speaking Finnish poet, early Swedish language modernist
- Jela Spiridonović-Savić (1890–1974), Serbian/Yugoslav poet
- Alfonsina Storni (1892–1938), Argentine poet of the modernist period
- Yelizaveta Tarakhovskaya (1891–1968), Soviet Russian poet, playwright, translator and children's author
- Teiko Tomita (1896–1990), American poet
- Marina Tsvetaeva (1892–1941), Russian and Soviet poet
- Erzsi Újvári (1899–1940), Hungarian poet
- Alice Lardé de Venturino (1895–1983), Salvador poet and writer
- Charlotte Wilder (1898–1980), American poet

== 1900s ==
In alphabetical order:

- Helen Adam (1909–1993), Scottish poet, collagist and photographer
- Mririda n'Ait Attik (c. 1900 – c. 1940s), Moroccan poet
- Rose Ausländer (1901–1988), Bucovina-born poet writing in German and English
- Ángela Figuera Aymerich (1902–1984), Basque and Spanish poet and writer
- Anna Barkova (1901–1976), Soviet poet, playwright, essayist and fiction writer
- Mary Barnard (1909–2001), American poet, biographer and Greek-to-English translator
- Joan Barton (1908–1986), English poet and bookseller
- Gwendolyn B. Bennett (1902–1981), African-American writer
- Karin Boye (1900–1941), Swedish poet and novelist
- Dilys Cadwaladr (1902–1979), Welsh-language poet and fiction writer
- Gladys Casely-Hayford (1904–1950), Sierra Leonean poet
- Anica Černej (1900–1944), Slovenian poet and author
- Subhadra Kumari Chauhan (1904–1948), Indian poet writing emotionally charged Hindi songs
- Mae Virginia Cowdery (1909–1948), African-American poe
- Meta Davis Cumberbatch (1900–1978), Trinidad-born pianist, composer, poet, playwright and cultural activist
- Clarissa Scott Delany (1901–1927), African-American poet, essayist, educator and social worker
- Ashapoorna Devi (1909–1995), Bengali novelist and poet
- Hilde Domin (1909–2006), German poet
- Gamila El Alaily (1907–1991), Egyptian poet and novelist
- Parvin E'tesami (1907–1941), Persian poet of Iran
- Margiad Evans (1909–1958), English poet, novelist and illustrator
- Georgie Starbuck Galbraith (1909–1980), American writer of light verse
- Madeline Gleason (1903–1979), American poet and dramatist
- Rumer Godden (1907–1998), English poet, novelist and children's writer
- Phoebe Hesketh (1909–2005), English poet
- Ofelia Hooper (1900–1981), Panamanian poet and sociologist
- Ada Verdun Howell (1902–1981), Australian author and poet
- Josephine Jacobsen (1908–2003), American poet, fiction writer and critic; 21st US Poet Laureate
- Helene Johnson (1906–1995), American poet
- Marie Luise Kaschnitz (1901–1974), German novelist and poet
- Halina Konopacka (1900–1989), Polish writer, poet and athlete
- Ruth Krauss (1901–1993), American poet and children's writer
- Lin Huiyin (1904–1955), Chinese architect and writer
- Anne Morrow Lindbergh (1906–2001), American poet, author and aviator
- Dorothy Livesay (1909–1996), Canadian poet
- Dulce María Loynaz (1902–1997), Cuban poet and novelist
- Una Marson (1905–1965), Jamaican activist and poet
- Phyllis McGinley (1905–1978), American author of children's books and poetry
- Cecília Meireles (1901–1964), Brazilian writer and educator
- Ruth Moore (1903–1989), American fiction writer and poet
- Salomėja Nėris (1904–1945), Lithuanian poet and political commentator
- Adalgisa Nery (1905–1980), Brazilian poet, novelist, journalist and politician
- Lorine Niedecker (1903–1970), American poet; only woman associated with Objectivist poets
- Silvina Ocampo (1903–1994), Argentine poet and short story writer
- Mary Oppen (1908–1990), American activist, artist, photographer, poet and writer
- Josefina Pla (1903–1999), Spanish poet, playwright, art critic and painter
- Margaret Steuart Pollard (1904–1996), English scholar and poet in the Cornish language
- Kathleen Raine (1908–2003), English poet, critic and scholar
- Laura Riding (1901–1991), American poet, critic, fiction writer and essayist
- Pavla Rovan (1908–1999), Slovenian poet and writer
- Ana María Martínez Sagi (1907–2000), Spanish (Catalan) poet and athlete
- Marija Mijot (1902–1994), Slovenian seamstress, dialectal poet, writer and playwright
- Oda Schaefer (1900–1988), German poet and journalist
- Lilian Serpas (1905–1985), Salvador poet
- Stevie Smith (1902–1971), English poet and novelist
- Anna Świrszczyńska (1909–1984), Polish poet
- Olena Teliha (1906–1942), Ukrainian poet
- Rosemary Thomas (1901–1961), American poet and teacher
- Moti Laxmi Upasika (1909–1997), Nepalese poet and fiction writer
- Katri Vala (1901–1944), Finnish poet
- Mahadevi Varma (1906–1987), Hindi poet, freedom fighter, woman's activist and educationist
- Louise Leveque de Vilmorin (1902–1969), French novelist, poet, and journalist
- Halina Weinstein (190–1942), Polish poet, linguist and Esperantist
- Viola S. Wendt (1907–1986), American poet and educator
- Anne Elizabeth Wilson (1901–1946), American-born Canadian poet, writer and editor
- Marguerite Young (1908–1995), American poet and novelist
- Esperanza Zambrano (1901–1992), Mexican poet
- Marya Zaturenska (1902–1982), American poet; won 1938 Pulitzer Prize for Poetry

== 1910s ==
In alphabetical order:

- Virginia Hamilton Adair (1913–2004), American poet
- Rabab Al-Kadhimi (1918–1998), Iraqi poet and dentist
- Sophia de Mello Breyner Andresen (1919–2004), Portuguese poet and writer
- Dorothy Auchterlonie (1915–1991), English-born Australian academic, literary critic and poet
- Margaret Avison (1918–2007), Canadian poet, editor and speaker
- Louise Bennett (1919–2006), Jamaican poet, folklorist and educator
- Elizabeth Bishop (1911–1979), American poet and short-story writer
- Gwendolyn Brooks (1917–2000), African-American poet; 30th US Poet Laureate
- Helle Busacca (1915–1996), Sicilian Italian poet, writer and painter
- Christine Busta (1915–1987), Austrian poet
- Matilde Camus (1919–2012), Spanish poet and writer
- Aída Cartagena Portalatín (1918–1994), Dominican poet, fiction writer and essayist
- Joy Davidman (1915–1960), American writer and poet, wife of C. S. Lewis
- Violet Kazue de Cristoforo (1917–2007), American poet
- Madeline DeFrees (1919–2015), American poet
- Joan Adeney Easdale (1913–1998), English poet
- Elvira Farreras i Valentí (1913–2005), Spanish (Catalan) poet and essayist
- Penelope Fitzgerald (1916–2000), Booker Prize-winning English novelist, poet, essayist and biographer
- Maria Assumpció Soler i Font (1913–2004), Spanish (Catalan) poet and writer
- Grace Beacham Freeman (1916–2002), American poet, columnist, short story writer, and South Carolina Poet Laureate 1985–1986
- Isabella Gardner (1915–1981), American poet and actress, namesake of the Isabella Gardner Poetry Award
- Jean Garrigue (1912–1972), American poet
- Zuzanna Ginczanka (1917–1945), Polish poet and Holocaust victim
- Virginia Graham (1910–1993), English poet and humorist
- Anne Hébert (1916–2000), Canadian author and poet
- Esmé Hooton (1914–1992), English poet
- Christine Lavant (1915–1973), Austrian poet and novelist
- Matilde Elena López (1919–2010), Salvadorean poet, essayist and playwright
- Kersti Merilaas (1913–1986), Estonian poet and translator
- Josephine Miles (1911–1985), American poet and literary critic
- Hilda Mundy (1912–1980), Bolivian writer, poet, journalist
- Amrita Pritam (1919–2005), Indian (Punjabi) poet, novelist and essayist
- Anne Ridler (1912–2001), English poet and playwright
- Muriel Rukeyser (1913–1980), American poet and political activist
- Helena Sanders (1911–1997), Cornish poet, humanitarian, cultural activist and politician
- May Sarton (1912–1995), Belgian American poet, novelist, and memoirist
- Johanna Schouten-Elsenhout (1910–1992), Suriname poet and community leader
- Stella Sierra (1917–1997), Panamanian poet and prose writer
- Ljubka Šorli (1910–1993), Slovenian writer, poet and teacher
- Ann Stanford (1916–1987), American poet
- Ruth Stone (1915–2011), American poet, author and teacher
- May Swenson (1913–1989), American poet and playwright
- Magda Szabó (1917–2007), Hungarian novelist, poet and playwright
- Maria Luise Thurmair (1912–2005), Austrian/German hymnist and writer
- Joan Ure (1918–1978), Scottish poet and playwright
- Margaret Walker (1915–1998), American poet and novelist
- Judith Wright (1915–2000), Australian poet, environmentalist and campaigner for Aboriginal land rights
- Audrey Wurdemann (1911–1960), American poet, winner of 1935 Pulitzer Prize for Poetry
- Yana Yazova (1912–1974), Bulgarian poet, writer and historian; real name Ljuba Gantcheva
- Unica Zürn (1916–1970), German poet and painter

== 1920s ==
In alphabetical order:

- Nazik Al-Malaika (1923–2007), Iraqi poet
- Maqbula al-Shalak (1921–1986), Syrian poet, children's writer and activist
- Claribel Alegría (1924–2018), Nicaraguan poet, essayist, novelist and journalist
- Maya Angelou (1928–2014), American memoirist, popular poet, and civil rights activist
- Thea Astley (1925–2004), Australian fiction writer and poet
- Arthenia J. Bates Millican (1920–2012), American poet, short-story writer, essayist and educator
- Ruth Bidgood (1922–2022), Welsh poet and local historian
- Erika Burkart (1922–2010), Swiss poet and writer in German
- Juanita Casey (1925–2012), English Gypsy poet, novelist and horse breeder
- Rosario Castellanos (1925–1974), Mexican poet and author
- Paulette Cherici-Porello (1924–2018), Monegasque poet and writer
- Amy Clampitt (1920–1994), American poet and author
- Juana Dib (1924–2015), Argentine poet, journalist, and teacher
- Blaga Dimitrova (1922–2003), Bulgarian poet and Vice President of Bulgaria
- Rosemary Dobson (1920–2012), Australian poet, illustrator, editor and anthologist
- Yulia Drunina (1924–1991), Soviet Russian poet
- Fangge Dupan (杜潘芳格, 1927–2016), Taiwanese poet
- Mona Jane Van Duyn (1921–2004), American poet and US Poet Laureate
- Annette Mbaye d'Erneville (born 1926), Senegalese poet and writer
- Mari Evans (1923–2017), American poet
- Sarah Webster Fabio (1928–1979), American poet, literary critic and educator
- Aminath Faiza (1924–2011), Maldive poet and author
- U. A. Fanthorpe (1929–2009), English poet
- Janet Frame (1924–2004), New Zealand poet and fiction writer
- FrancEyE (1922–2007), American poet, born Frances Dean Smith
- Olga Gonçalves (1929–2004), Portuguese poet and novelist
- Alda Neves da Graça do Espírito Santo (1926–2010), São Tomé e Príncipe poet
- Barbara Guest (1920–2006), American poet and author
- Julia Hartwig (1921–2017), Polish poet and translator
- Gwen Harwood (1920–1995), Australian poet and librettist
- Dorothy Hewett (1923–2002), Australian feminist poet, novelist, librettist and playwright
- Constance Hunting (1925–2006), American poet and publisher
- Ada Jafri (1924–2015), Indian/Pakistani poet and writer
- Elizabeth Jennings (1926–2001), English poet
- Hawa Jibril (1920–2011), Somali poet
- Anna Kamieńska (1920–1986), Polish poet, writer and translator
- Eriko Kishida (1929–2011), Japanese poet, children's author, lyricist, and translator
- Shirley Kaufman (1923–2016), American/Israeli poet and translator
- Eila Kivikk'aho (1921–2004), Finnish poet
- Carolyn Kizer (1925–2014), Pulitzer Prize-winning American poet; noted for feminist poetry
- Maxine Kumin (1925–2014), American poet and author; 26th US Poet Laureate
- Ana Emilia Lahitte (1929–2013), Argentine poet, writer, and playwright
- Ursula K. Le Guin (1929–2018), American poet and author
- Denise Levertov (1923–1997), English-born American poet
- Marjorie Oludhe Macgoye (1928–2015), English/Kenyan poet and fiction writer
- Eeva-Liisa Manner (1921–1995), Finnish poet, playwright and translator
- Joyce Mansour (1928–1986), Egyptian/French poet
- Manuela Margarido (1925–2007), São Tomé and Príncipe poet and diplomat
- Ludmiła Marjańska (1923–2005), Polish poet and translator
- Selma Meerbaum-Eisinger (1924–1942), Romanian-born German poet
- Máire Mhac an tSaoi (1922–2021), Irish language scholar, poet, writer and academic
- Lisel Mueller (1924–2020), German-born American poet
- Malkat al-Dar Muhammad (1920–1969), Sudanese poet, novelist and composer
- Inge Müller (1925–1966), German poet
- Ágnes Nemes Nagy (1922–1991), Hungarian poet, writer and translator
- Oodgeroo Noonuccal (a.k.a. Kath Walker, 1920–1993), Australian poet, political activist and artist
- Grace Paley (1922–2007), American-Jewish fiction writer, poet, and political activist
- Esdras Parra (1929–2004), Venezuelan poet and writer
- Vesna Parun (1922–2010), Croatian poet
- Marie Ponsot (1921–2019), American poet, literary critic, essayist, teacher, and translator
- Jenny Lind Porter (1927–2020), American poet and educator
- Luz Pozo Garza (1922–2020), Spanish poet
- Adrienne Rich (1929–2012), American poet, essayist and feminist
- Dora Isella Russell (1925–1990), Uruguayan poet, journalist
- Carmelina Sánchez-Cutillas i Martínez del Romero (1921–2009), Spanish historian, novelist and poet
- Giovanna Sandri (1923–2002), Italian visual poet
- Iryna Senyk (1926–2009), poet
- Anne Sexton (1928–1974), American poet, known for highly personal, confessional verse
- Bessie Skea (1923–1996), Scottish poet from Orkney
- Noémia de Sousa (1926–2002), Mozambique poet
- Julie Suk (1924–2025), American poet
- Efua Sutherland (1924–1996), Ghanaian playwright, children's author, poet and dramatist
- Wislawa Szymborska (1923–2012), Polish poet, essayist and translator; won 1996 Nobel Prize in Literature
- Alcira Cardona Torrico (1926–2003), Bolivian writer and poet
- Mona Van Duyn (1921–2004), American poet; 36th US Poet Laureate
- Phyllis Webb (1927–2021), Canadian poet and radio broadcaster
- Hannah Weiner (1928–1997), American poet; often grouped with the Language poets
- Christa Wolf (1929–2011), German poet, critic and novelist
- Mitsuye Yamada (born 1923), Japanese American activist, essayist, poet, story writer and editor
- Chia-ying Yeh (1924–2024), Chinese-Canadian poet

== 1930s ==
In alphabetical order:

- Fleur Adcock (1934–2024), poet and editor of English and Northern Irish ancestry
- Bella Akhmadulina (1937–2010), Soviet and Russian poet, short story writer, and translator
- Anne-Marie Albiach (1937–2012), French poet and translator
- Daniela Albizu (1936–2015), Basque poet, writer
- Bisera Alikadić (1939–2026), Bosnian poet and author
- Klairi Angelidou (1932–2021), Cypriot poet, translator and philologist
- Margaret Atwood (born 1939), Canadian poet, novelist, literary critic, essayist and environmental activist
- A. S. Byatt (1936–2023), English novelist and poet
- Neriman Cahit (born 1937), Turkish Cypriot poet, author and prominent women's rights advocate
- Diana Chang (1934–2009), Chinese American novelist and poet
- Hélène Cixous (born 1937), Algerian-born French poet, playwright and philosopher
- Gillian Clarke (born 1937), Welsh poet, playwright, editor, broadcaster, lecturer and translator
- Lucille Clifton (1936–2010), American writer and educator
- Elizabeth Cook-Lynn (1930–2023), Crow Creek Lakota Sioux editor, essayist, poet, novelist, and academic
- Jayne Cortez (1936–2012), American poet and performance artist
- Vilborg Dagbjartsdóttir (1930–2021), Icelandic poet
- Kamala Das (1934–2009), Indian English poet and littérateur
- Olga Xirinacs Díaz (born 1936), writer and piano teacher
- Zuhur Dixon (1933–2021), Iraqi poet
- Leila Djabali (born 1933), Algerian poet and intellectual
- Malkica Dugeč (1936–2026), Croatian poet
- Muzi Epifani (1935–1984), Italian novelist and poet
- Elke Erb (1938–2024), German poet, editor and translator
- Ruth Fainlight (born 1931), US-born English poet, short story writer, translator and librettist
- Forough Farrokhzad (1935–1967), Iranian poet and film director
- Elaine Feinstein (1930–2019), English poet, novelist and biographer
- Ágnes Gergely (born 1933), Hungarian poet, essayist and translator
- Ellen Gilchrist (1935–2024), American novelist, short story writer and poet
- Halima Godane (1935–1994), Somali poet and activist
- Patricia Goedicke (1931–2006), American poet
- Georgina Herrera (1936–2021), Cuban poet
- Hilda Hilst (1930–2004), Brazilian poet, playwright and novelist
- Mary Ann Hoberman (1930–2023), American poet and children's writer
- Barbara Holland (1933–2010), American children's writer, poet and memoirist
- Susan Howe (born 1937), American poet, scholar, essayist and critic; closely associated with Language poets
- Raquel Ilombé (1938–1992), Equatorial Guinean poet and author
- Nora Iuga (born 1931), Romanian poet, writer and translator
- Patricia Janus (1932–2006), American poet, artist and educator
- Rita Joe (1932–2007), Canadian poet
- Anna Jókai (1932–2017), Hungarian poet, author and teacher
- Ingrid Jonker (1933–1965), South African poet
- June Jordan (1936–2002), American poet, essayist, journalist, novelist, librettist and autobiographer
- Jenny Joseph (1932–2018), English poet
- Antigone Kefala (1935–2022), Australian poet and prose-writer of Greek-Romanian heritage
- Adrienne Kennedy (born 1931), American playwright and poet
- Vénus Khoury-Ghata (1937–2026), Lebanese-French poet and writer
- Sarah Kirsch (1935–2013), German poet and translator
- Sarah Klassen (born 1932), Canadian poet and fiction writer
- Gwendoline Konie (1938–2009), Zambian poet, diplomat and politician
- Lina Kostenko (born 1930), Ukrainian poet
- Urszula Kozioł (1931–2025), Polish poet
- Momoko Kuroda (黒田杏子, 1938–2023), Japanese haiku poet and essayist
- Joanne Kyger (1934–2017), American poet tied to Black Mountain, San Francisco Renaissance and Beat generation
- Alda Lara (1930–1962), Angolan poet
- Audre Lorde (1934–1992), Caribbean-American writer, poet and activist
- Glenna Luschei (1934-2025), Poet laureate emerita of San Luis Obispo, creator of Glenna Luschei Prize for African Poetry
- Ana María Llona Málaga (born 1936), Peruvian poet
- Alda Merini (1931–2009), Italian writer and poet
- Barbara Moraff (1939–2024), American poet of the Beat generation
- Martha Nasibù (1931–2020), Ethiopian/French poet, writer and artist
- Olga Nolla (1938–2001), Puerto Rican poet, writer and professor
- Helga M. Novak (1935–2013), German poet and political writer
- Joyce Carol Oates (born 1938), American author
- Mary Oliver (1935–2019), American poet
- Agnieszka Osiecka (1936–1997), Polish poet and screenplay writer
- Alicia Ostriker (born 1937), American poet and scholar writing Jewish feminist poetry
- Atena Pashko (1931–2012), Ukrainian chemical engineer, poet, and social activist
- Amelia Blossom Pegram (1935–2022), South African poet
- Marge Piercy (born 1936), American poet, novelist and social activist
- Alejandra Pizarnik (1936–1972), Argentine poet
- Sylvia Plath (1932–1963), American poet and fiction writer
- Halina Poświatowska (1935–1967), Polish poet
- Diane di Prima (1934–2020), American poet
- Dahlia Ravikovitch (1936–2005), Israeli poet, translator and peace activist
- Mirkka Rekola (1931–2014), Finnish poet
- Adrienne Rich (1929–2012), American poet and writer
- Sonia Sanchez (born 1934), African-American poet
- Pat Schneider (1934–2020), American writer, poet and editor
- Nina Serrano (born 1934), American poet, writer, storyteller and media producer
- Bennie Lee Sinclair (1939–2000), American poet and fiction writer, South Carolina Poet Laureate, 1986–2000
- Fatou Ndiaye Sow (1937–2004), Senegalese poet, children's writer and teacher
- Donna J. Stone (1933–1994), American poet and philanthropist
- Karen Swenson (born 1936), American poet and journalist
- Elaine Terranova (born 1939), American poet
- Laura Ulewicz (1930–2007), American poet
- Lobat Vala (born 1930), Iranian poet and campaigner
- Jean Valentine (1934–2020), American poet; New York State Poet Laureate
- Diane Wakoski (born 1937), American poet
- Rosmarie Waldrop (born 1935), American poet, translator and publisher
- Eleanor Wilner (born 1937), American poet and editor
- Dede Wilson (born 1937), American poet
- Nellie Wong (1934–2026), Chinese-American feminist poet
- Shaïda Zarumey (born 1938), Niger poet and sociologist
- Fay Zwicky (1933–2017), Australian poet, short-story writer, critic and academic

== 1940s ==
In alphabetical order:

- Kathy Acker (1947–1997), American experimental novelist, punk poet, playwright, postmodernist and sex-positive feminist writer
- Diane Ackerman (born 1948), American essayist and naturalist
- Ama Ata Aidoo (1940–2023), Ghanaian poet, novelist, playwright and short-story writer
- Gloria E. Anzaldúa (1942–2004), American author, poet and activist
- Rae Armantrout (born 1947), American writer, Language poet and professor
- Akram Monfared Arya (born 1946), Iranian/Swedish writer, politician and aircraft pilot
- Pam Ayres (born 1947), English poet, songwriter and radio/TV presenter
- Mary Jo Bang (born 1946), American poet
- Miryana Ivanova Basheva (1947–2020), Bulgarian poet
- Olinda Beja (born 1946), São Tomé and Príncipe poet, writer and narrator
- Mei-mei Berssenbrugge (born 1947), Chinese American poet associated with Language poetry, the New York School, phenomenology, and visual art
- Linda Bierds (born 1945), American poet and professor
- Becky Birtha (born 1948), American poet and children's author
- Eavan Boland (1944–2020), Irish poet
- Douangdeuane Bounyavong (born 1947), Laotian poet, novelist and non-fiction writer
- Cathy Smith Bowers (born 1949), American poet; North Carolina Poet Laureate 2010–2012
- Nicole Brossard (born 1943), French Canadian formalist poet and novelist
- Olga Broumas (born 1949), Greek poet living in United States
- Flora Brovina (born 1949), Kosovar poet and politician
- Andrea Hollander Budy (born 1947), American poet
- Kathryn Stripling Byer (1944–2017), American poet and teacher; North Carolina Poet Laureate 2005–2009
- Caroline Caddy (born 1944), Australian poet
- Luzmila Carpio (born 1949), Bolivian song-writer
- Kelly Cherry (1940–2022), American poet and author
- Chrystos (born 1946), Menominee rights activist and poet
- Daria Chubata (born 1940), Ukrainian physician, writer, poet
- Michelle Cliff (1946–2016), Jamaican/American poet and fiction writer
- Norma Cole (born 1945), American poet, visual artist, and translator
- Wanda Coleman (1946–2013), American poet
- Anne Compton (born 1947), Canadian poet, critic, and anthologist
- Wendy Cope (born 1945), English poet
- Elsa Cross (born 1946), Mexican poet and essayist
- Doris Davenport (born 1949), American educator poet
- Regina Derieva (1949–2013), Russian poet and writer
- Toi Derricotte (born 1941), American poet and professor
- Annie Dillard (born 1945), American nonfiction writer, poet, essayist and novelist
- Berlie Doherty (born 1943), English novelist, poet, playwright, screenwriter and children's writer
- Rachel Blau DuPlessis (1941–2026), American poet, essayist, feminist critic, and scholar
- Bohdana Durda (born 1940), Ukrainian writer, poet, songwriter
- Lynn Emanuel (born 1949), American poet
- Clarissa Pinkola Estés (born 1945), American poet
- Diane Fahey (born 1945), Australian poet
- Renée Ferrer de Arréllaga (born 1944), Paraguayan poet and novelist
- Veronica Forrest-Thomson (1947–1975), Scottish poet and theorist
- Tess Gallagher (born 1943), American poet, essayist, author and playwright
- Nikki Giovanni (1943–2024), African-American poet, writer, commentator, activist, and educator
- Banira Giri (1946–2021), Nepalese poet and author
- Diane Glancy (born 1941), American poet, novelist and playwright
- Louise Glück (1943–2023), American poet; 42nd US Poet Laureate
- Lorna Goodison (born 1947), Jamaican poet
- Hedwig Gorski (born 1949), American performance poet and avant-garde artist
- Hattie Gossett (born 1942), African-American feminist playwright, poet, and magazine editor
- Judy Grahn (born 1940), American feminist, lesbian poet
- Debora Greger (born 1949), American poet and visual artist
- Linda Gregg (1942–2019), American poet
- Susan Griffin (1943–2025), American poet, playwright and philosopher
- M. A. Griffiths (1947–2009), English poet
- Marilyn Hacker (born 1942), American poet, translator and critic
- Jessica Hagedorn (born 1949), Filipino American poet, playwright and novelist
- Eloise Klein Healy (born 1943), American poet, first Poet Laureate of Los Angeles, professor at Antioch University
- Lyn Hejinian (1941–2024), American poet, essayist, translator and publisher
- Lin Van Hek (born 1944), Australian poet and novelist
- Guðrið Helmsdal (born 1941), Faroese poet
- Linda Hogan (born 1947), American poet and fiction writer
- Libby Houston (born 1941), English poet, botanist, and rock climber
- Fanny Howe (1940–2025), American poet and fiction writer
- Ingibjörg Haraldsdóttir (1942–2016), Icelandic poet
- Erica Jong (born 1942), American author and teacher
- Jane Kenyon (1947–1995), American poet and translator
- Mimi Khalvati (born 1944), Iranian-born English poet
- Hamda Khamis (born 1945), Bahrain poet and columnist
- Karin Kiwus (born 1942), German poet
- Ursula Krechel (born 1947), German poet and writer
- Carolyn Kreiter-Foronda (born 1946), American poet; Poet Laureate of Virginia
- Mira Kuś (born 1948), Polish poet and journalist
- Ann Lauterbach (born 1942), American poet, essayist and professor
- Tanith Lee (1947–2015), English novelist, poet and screenwriter
- Lalitha Lenin (born 1946), Indian poet in Malayalam
- Catherine Lim (林宝音, born 1942), Singaporean poet and fiction writer
- Ewa Lipska (born 1945), Polish poet
- Liz Lochhead (born 1947), Scottish poet and dramatist
- Christine De Luca (born 1947), Scottish poet and writer
- Gwendolyn MacEwen (1941–1987), Canadian poet and novelist
- Mary Mackey (born 1945), American novelist, poet and academic
- Jennifer Maiden (born 1949), Australian poet
- Angela Marinescu (1941–2023), Romanian poet
- Daphne Marlatt (born 1942), Canadian poet
- Bernadette Mayer (1945–2022), American poet, writer and visual artist
- Susan McCaslin (born 1947), Canadian poet
- Heather McHugh (born 1948), American poet
- Jane Miller (born 1949), American poet
- Janice Mirikitani (1941–2021), American poet
- Susan Mitchell (born 1944), American poet, essayist and translator
- Grace Mera Molisa (1947–2002), ni-Vanuatu politician, poet and campaigner for women's equality
- Nancy Morejón (born 1944), Cuban poet, critic and essayist
- Robin Morgan (1941–2026), American poet, author and lecturer
- Micere Githae Mugo (1942–2023), Kenyan poet, playwright and professor
- Joan Murray (born 1945), American poet, writer and playwright
- Carol Muske-Dukes (born 1945), American poet, novelist, essayist and professor; California Poet Laureate
- Marilyn Nelson (born 1946), American poet, translator and children's author
- Kavidi Wivine N'Landu (living), DR Congo poet and politician
- Alice Notley (1945–2025), American poet
- Clémentine Nzuji (born 1944), Congolese poet and writer
- Florence Ogawa (1947–2010), American poet
- Sharon Olds (born 1942), American poet
- Ljubica Ostojić (1945–2021), Bosnian poet, writer and playwright
- Ruth Padel (born 1946), English poet and non-fiction author on poetry and nature writing
- Ánxeles Penas (born 1943), Spanish poet
- Katha Pollitt (born 1949), American feminist poet, essayist and critic
- Dina Posada (born 1946), Salvadoran poet
- Thuraya Qabil (1943–2026), Saudi Arabian poet and journalist
- Jennifer Rankin (1941–1979), Australian poet and playwright
- Denise Riley (born 1948), English poet and philosopher
- Althea Romeo-Mark (born 1948), Antigua poet, writer and educator
- Penelope Rosemont (born 1942), American poet, writer and visual artist
- Cristina Peri Rossi (born 1941), Uruguayan poet, fiction writer and translator
- Susanna Roxman (1946–2015), Swedish-born English poet and critic
- Kay Ryan (born 1945), American poet and educator; 16th US Poet Laureate
- Olive Senior (born 1941), Jamaican poet, novelist, short story and non-fiction writer
- Ntozake Shange (1948–2018), American poet and playwright
- Leslie Marmon Silko (born 1948), American poet and fiction writer
- Marilyn Singer (born 1948), American poet and children's writer
- Patti Smith (born 1946), American singer-songwriter, poet and visual artist
- Stephanie Strickland (born 1942), American poet and exponent of electronic literature
- Telcine Turner-Rolle (1944–2012), Bahamas poet, playwright and educator
- Jane Urquhart (born 1949), Canadian novelist and poet
- Amy Uyematsu (1947–2023), American poet
- Janine Pommy Vega (1942–2010), American poet associated with Beat generation
- Judit Vihar (born 1944), Hungarian poet and literary historian
- Ellen Bryant Voigt (1943–2025), American poet and essayist
- Anne Waldman (born 1945), American poet
- Alice Walker (born 1944), American author, poet and activist
- Sherley Anne Williams (1944–1999), American poet, novelist and playwright
- Connie Willis (born 1945), American poet and short story writer
- Wong May (born 1944), Singaporean/Irish poet
- Merle Woo (born 1941), Asian American teacher, poet and activist
- Carolyn D. Wright (1949–2016), American poet
- Halima Xudoyberdiyeva (1947–2018), Uzbek poet, People's Poet of Uzbekistan
- Ekaterina Petrova Yosifova (1941–2022), Bulgarian poet, educator and journalist

== 1950s ==
In alphabetical order:

- Catherine Obianuju Acholonu (1951–2014), Nigerian poet and researcher
- Flutura Açka (born 1956), Albanian economist, journalist, poet, publisher and politician
- Patricia J. Adams (born 1952), Anguillan poet and writer
- Kim Addonizio (born 1954), American poet and novelist
- Josephine Balmer (born 1959), English poet, translator and critic
- Fevziye Rahgozar Barlas (born 1955), Afghan poet and fiction writer
- Mubarkah Bent al-Barra (born 1957), Mauritanian poet and translator
- Dawn-Michelle Baude (born 1959), American poet, journalist and educator
- Nura Bazdulj-Hubijar (born 1951), Bosnian poet, writer and playwright
- Marion Bethel (born 1953), Bahamas poet, essayist and attorney
- Valerie Bloom (born 1956), Jamaican poet and novelist
- Tanella Boni (born 1954), Côte d'Ivoire poet and novelist
- Itxaro Borda (born 1959), French Basque poet, novelist, translator
- Jenny Boult (1951–2005), Australian poet, playwright, and editor
- Melba Boyd (born 1950), African-American poet
- Alison Brackenbury (born 1953), English poet
- Ivanka Brađašević (born 1955), Croatian poet
- Di Brandt (born 1952), Canadian poet and scholar
- Giannina Braschi (born 1953), Puerto Rican poet and writer
- Jean "Binta" Breeze (1956–2021), Jamaican dub poet and storyteller
- Fern G. Z. Carr (born 1956), Canadian poet, translator and lawyer
- Anne Carson (born 1950), Canadian poet, essayist and translator
- Ana Castillo (born 1953), Mexican-American fiction writer, poet and essayist
- Catherine Chandler (born 1950), American/Canadian poet and translator
- Andrea Cheng (1957–2015), American poet and children's writer
- Edith Checa (1957–2017), Spanish poet, writer, and journalist
- Marilyn Chin (born 1955), American poet and writer
- Sandra Cisneros (born 1954), American writer
- Michelle T. Clinton (born 1955), African-American poet
- Judith Ortiz Cofer (1952–2016), Puerto Rican poet and author
- Allison Hedge Coke (born 1958), American/Canadian poet
- Merle Collins (born 1950), Grenadian poet and fiction writer
- Judy Croome (born 1958), South African poet and novelist
- Bernadette Sanou Dao (born 1952), Burkina Faso poet, fiction writer and politician
- Tina Darragh (born 1950), American Language poet
- Mahadai Das (1954–2003), Guyanese poet and academic
- Ananda Devi (born 1957), Mauritian poet and fiction writer
- Imtiaz Dharker (born c. 1954), English poet, artist and film-maker
- Koumanthio Zeinab Diallo (born 1956), Guinean poet, novelist and playwright
- Chitra Banerjee Divakaruni (born 1956), Indian-American poet and fiction writer
- Rita Dove (born 1952), American poet and essayist
- Jane Draycott (born 1954), English poet and university teacher
- Vera Duarte (born 1952), Cape Verdean poet and politician
- Carol Ann Duffy (born 1955), Scottish poet and playwright; first female Poet Laureate of the United Kingdom
- Marilyn Dumont (born 1955), First Nations Canadian poet
- Helen Dunmore (1952–2017), English poet, novelist and children's writer
- Claudia Emerson (1957–2014), American poet; won the 2006 Pulitzer Prize for Poetry
- Louise Erdrich (born 1954), American poet and fiction writer
- Annie Finch (born 1956), American poet, playwright and performance artist
- Rosa Méndez Fonte (born 1957), Galician poet, writer, and researcher
- Vivienne Finch (born 1950s, deceased 2000), English poet (Owl Master), translator of Paul Reverdy, magazine editor and broadcaster
- Nikky Finney (born 1957), American poet
- Carolyn Forché (born 1950), American poet, translator and professor
- Coralie Frei (born 1951), Comoros/Swiss poet and novelist
- Alice Fulton (born 1952), American author and poet
- Chitra Gajadin (born 1954), Surinamese/Dutch poet, writer and playwright
- Amy Gerstler (born 1956), American poet
- Jorie Graham (born 1950), American poet
- Jane Greer (1953–2025), American poet
- Kimiko Hahn (born 1955), American poet
- Joy Harjo (born 1951), American poet, former United States Poet Laureate
- Carla Harryman (born 1952), American poet, essayist, and playwright, associated with Language poets
- Katherine Hastings (born 1950), American poet
- Jane Hirshfield (born 1953), American poet, essayist and translator
- Lynda Hull (1954–1994), American poet
- Julie Kane (born 1952), American poet, scholar and editor; Louisiana Poet Laureate 2011–2013
- Mary Karr (born 1955), American poet and essayist
- Barbara Kingsolver (born 1955), American fiction writer, poet and essayist
- Katarzyna Krenz (born 1953), Polish writer, poet and painter
- Antjie Krog (born 1952), South African poet and journalist in Afrikaans
- Dorianne Laux (born 1952), American poet
- Sue Lenier (born 1957), English poet and playwright
- Krystyna Lenkowska (born 1957), Polish poet and translator
- Rika Lesser (born 1953), American poet and translator
- Corinth Morter Lewis (living), Belize poet and educator
- Gwyneth Lewis (born 1959), Welsh poet and inaugural National Poet of Wales
- Sarah Lindsay (born 1958), American poet
- Suzanne Lummis (born 1951), American poet and publisher; founder of Los Angeles Poetry Festival
- Jully Makini (born 1953), Solomon Islands poet, writer and women's rights activist
- Chris Mansell (born 1953), Australian poet and publisher
- Lee Maracle (1950–2021), Canadian poet, novelist and storyteller
- Maria Mercè Marçal (1952–1998), Catalan poet
- Camille Martin (born 1956), Canadian poet and collage artist
- Dionyse McTair (born 1950), Trinidadian poet
- Grażyna Miller (1957–2009), Polish poet and translator
- Leslie Adrienne Miller (born 1956), American poet
- Cherrie Moraga (born 1952), Chicana poet, playwright, and essayist
- Aurora Levins Morales (born 1954), Puerto Rican essayist, poet and fiction writer
- Thylias Moss (born 1954), American poet, children's novelist, and playwright
- Lale Müldür (born 1956), Turkish poet and writer
- Harryette Mullen (born 1953), American poet, short story writer and literary scholar
- Herta Müller (born 1953), Romanian-born German novelist, poet and essayist; Nobel Prize in Literature winner
- Rosario Murillo (born 1951), Nicaraguan poet
- Sheila Murphy (born 1951), American poet and visual poet
- Susan Musgrave (born 1951), Canadian poet and children's writer
- J. C. Niala (living), Zanzibar/English poet and story-teller
- Grace Nichols (born 1950), Guyanese poet
- Elly Niland (born 1954), Guyanese poet, playwright and teacher
- Barbara Noda (born 1953), third generation Japanese American poet
- Naomi Shihab Nye (born 1952), American poet, songwriter and novelist
- Maggie O'Sullivan (born 1951), English poet of Irish descent, performer and visual artist
- Yolanda Pantin (born 1954), Venezuelan poet and children's writer
- Kathleen Peirce (born 1956), American poet
- Pascale Petit (born 1953), French-born Welsh poet and artist
- Chiranan Pitpreecha (born 1955), Thai poet and feminist
- Judith Pordon (born 1954), American poet and writer
- Dorothy Porter (1954–2008), Australian poet
- Karen Press (born 1956), South African English-language poet
- Viera Prokešová (1957–2008), Slovak poet, writer and translator
- Zsuzsa Rakovszky (born 1950), Hungarian poet and translator
- Ágnes Rapai (born 1952), Hungarian poet, writer and translator
- Irina Ratushinskaya (1954–2017), Soviet/Russian poet and writer
- Jutta Richter (born 1955), German author of children's and youth literature
- Luisa Ballesteros Rosas (born 1957), Colombian essayist, poet, and educator
- Barbara Rosiek (1959–2020), Polish poet, writer and psychologist
- Anne Rouse (born 1954), American-British poet
- Layla Sarahat Rushani (c. 1952/1954–2004), Afghan poet
- Gig Ryan (born 1956), Australian poet
- Kathrin Schmidt (born 1958), German writer
- Gjertrud Schnackenberg (born 1953), American poet
- Odete Semedo (born 1959), Guinea-Bissau poet, writer and educator
- Jo Shapcott (born 1953), English poet, editor and lecturer
- Edi Shukriu (1950–2023), Kosovar poet, politician and archaeologist
- Margaret Smith (born 1958), American poet, musician and artist
- Cathy Song (born 1955), American poet
- Susan Stewart (born 1952), American poet, university professor and critic
- Véronique Tadjo (born 1955), Côte d'Ivoire poet, novelist and artist
- Nancy Takacs (born 1952), American poet, professor, fiber artist
- Kebedech Tekleab (born 1958), Ethiopian poet and painter
- Eleni Theocharous (born 1953), Cypriot poet and politician
- Angela Topping (born 1954), English poet, literary critic and author
- Agata Tuszynska (born 1957), Polish writer, poet and journalist
- Chase Twichell (born 1950), American poet, professor and publisher
- Ania Walwicz (1951–2020), Australian poet and prose writer and visual artist
- Connie Wanek (born 1952), American poet
- Meralda Warren (born 1959), Pitcairn Island artist, poet and author
- Marjory Heath Wentworth (born 1958), American poet; South Carolina Poet Laureate
- Sheri-D Wilson (born 1958), Canadian poet, producer and lecturer
- Grażyna Wojcieszko (born 1957), Polish poet and essayist
- Tetiana Yakovenko (born 1954), Ukrainian poet, literary critic and teacher
- Neşe Yaşın (born 1959), Turkish Cypriot poet and author
- Yuan Chiung-chiung (袁瓊瓊, born 1950), Taiwanese poet, fiction writer and television writer

== 1960s ==
In alphabetical order:

- Patience Agbabi (born 1965), English poet
- Kelli Russell Agodon (born 1969), American poet
- Nura al-Badi (born 1969), Omani poet
- Kerstin Becker (born 1969), German writer and poet
- Khadija Besikri (born 1962), Libyan poet, writer and human rights activist
- Amba Bongo (born 1962), DR Congo poet and novelist
- Alison Calder (born 1969), Canadian poet and educator
- Kate Clanchy (born 1965), Scottish poet and writer
- Julia Copus (born 1969), English poet and children's writer
- M. T. C. Cronin (born 1963), Australian poet, lawyer and academic
- Anna Dodas i Noguer (1962–1986), Catalan poet
- Petya Dubarova (1962–1979), Bulgarian poet, school student
- Zena Edwards (born 1960s), British writer, poet and performer
- Milena Ercolani (born 1963), San Marino poet and novelist
- Jacinta Escudos (living), Salvadorian poet and fiction and non-fiction writer
- Maggie Estep (1963–2014), American poet and writer
- Magie Faure-Vidot (living), Seychelles poet
- Sia Figiel (1967–2026), Samoan novelist, poet, and painter
- Kate Gale (born 1965), American poet; founding publisher of Red Hen Press
- Karina Galvez (born 1964), Ecuadorian poet
- Stanka Gjurić (born 1966), Croatian poet and essayist
- Lavinia Greenlaw (born 1962), English poet and novelist
- Mariela Griffor (born 1961), Chilean poet, translator and diplomat
- Beth Gylys (born 1964), American poet and professor
- Roya Hakakian (born 1966), Iranian/American poet, writer and journalist
- Jennifer Michael Hecht (born 1965), American poet, historian, philosopher and author
- Ellen Hinsey (born 1960), American poet, translator and scholar
- Rozalie Hirs (born 1965), Dutch poet and composer
- Frieda Hughes (born 1960), English poet and painter
- Helen Ivory (born 1969), English poet, artist, tutor and editor
- Lisa Jarnot (born 1967), American poet
- Honorée Fanonne Jeffers (born 1967), American poet and novelist
- Judy Jordan (born 1961), American poet, novelist, and memoirist
- Sandra Pierrette Kanzié (born 1966), Burkina Faso poet
- Adeena Karasick (born 1965), Canadian poet, essayist and performance artist
- Julia Kasdorf (born 1962), American poet
- Laura Kasischke (born 1961), American poet
- Jackie Kay (born 1961), Scottish poet, playwright and novelist
- Ruth Ellen Kocher (born 1965), American poet
- Simona Lazăr (living), Romanian poet and gastronomic writer
- Danielle Legros Georges (c. 1965–2025), Haitian-born American poet, essayist and academic
- Dana Levin (born 1965), American poet and teacher
- Conceição Lima (born 1961), São Tomé and Príncipe poet
- LindaAnn Loschiavo (born c. 1960), American poet
- Zindzi Mandela (1960–2020), South African poet and diplomat
- Wendy McGrath (born 1960), Canadian poet and novelist
- Nora Méndez (born 1969), Salvadoran poet
- Sarah Messer (born 1966), American poet and author
- Cho Mina (born 1960), South Korean poet
- Ange Mlinko (born 1969), American poet and literary critic
- Nora Nadjarian (born 1966), Cypriot poet and fiction writer
- Taslima Nasrin (born 1962), Bengali doctor, novelist, poet and essayist
- Otoniya J. Okot Bitek (born 1966), Kenyan-born Ugandan diasporian poet and academic
- Alice Oswald (born 1966), English poet
- Vera Pavlova (born 1963), Russian poet
- Parween Pazhwak (born 1967), Afghan poet, writer and artist
- Marine Petrossian (born 1960), Armenian poet, essayist and columnist
- Duanwad Pimwana (born 1969), Thai poet, novelist and journalist
- Pascale Quao-Gaudens (born 1963), Côte d'Ivoire poet, writer and artist
- Samina Raja (1961–2012), Pakistani poet, writer, translator and broadcaster
- Claudia Rankine (born 1963), American poet and playwright
- Monika Rinck (born 1969), German poet and writer
- Lisa Robertson (born 1961), Canadian poet
- Mamta Sagar (born 1966), Kannada poet and playwright living in Bangalore
- Maryam Salama (born 1965), Libyan poet and writer
- Fiona Sampson (born 1968), English/Welsh poet and editor
- Dipti Saravanamuttu (born 1960), Sri Lankan-Australian poet and academic
- Rebecca Seiferle (living), American poet
- Narmala Shewcharan (living), Guyanese poet, novelist and anthropologist
- Dorothea Smartt (born 1963), English-born poet of Barbadian descent
- A. E. Stallings (born 1968), American poet and translator
- Lisa Gluskin Stonestreet (born 1968), American poet
- Maud Sulter (1960–2008), British fine artist and poet
- Krisztina Tóth (born 1967), Hungarian poet, writer and translator
- Ann Townsend (born 1962), American poet and essayist
- Elizabeth Treadwell (born 1967), American poet
- Natasha Trethewey (born 1966), American poet; Mississippi Poet Laureate, won the 2007 Pulitzer Prize for Poetry
- Reetika Vazirani (1962–2003), Indian/American poet and educator
- Phillippa Yaa de Villiers (born 1966), South African poet, dramatist and performance artist
- Rebecca Wee (living), American poet and academic
- Elizabeth Willis (born 1961), American poet, literary critic and professor
- Sholeh Wolpé (born 1962), Iranian/American poet, translator and playwright
- Jacqueline Woodson (born 1963), American poet
- Ester Xargay Melero (1960-2024), Spanish poet, video artist, translator and cultural agitator
- Cho Yongmee (born 1962), South Korean poet

== 1970s ==
In alphabetical order:

- Pilar Adón (born 1971), Spanish poet, novelist, short story writer and translator
- Sheetal Agashe (born 1977), Indian poet and businesswoman
- An Heon-mi (born 1972), South Korean poet
- Maryam Jafari Azarmani (born 1977), Iranian poet, essayist, critic and translator
- Siham Benchekroun (living), Moroccan poet and novelist
- Alexandra Bernhardt (born 1974), German philosopher, poet, writer, translator, editor and publisher
- Jacqueline Bishop (living), Jamaican poet, novelist and visual artist
- Malika Booker (born 1970), British poet and multi-disciplinary artist
- Shannon Bramer (born 1973), Canadian poet
- Colette Bryce (born 1970), Northern Irish poet
- Carmen Camacho (writer) (born 1976), Spanish writer, poet, columnist
- Susana Chávez (1974–2011), Mexican poet and human rights activist
- Grace Chia (born 1973), Singaporean poet, writer and journalist
- Eugenia Chuprina (born 1971), Ukrainian poet, novelist, writer, playwright
- Dani Couture (born 1978), Canadian poet and novelist
- Dhanashree Deshpande-Ganatra (born 1970), Indian poet
- Jennifer K Dick (born 1970), American poet
- Lidija Dimkovska (born 1971), Macedonian poet, novelist and translator
- Adda Djørup (born 1972), Danish poet and fiction writer
- Chay Douangphouxay (living), American poet of Lao-Khmer extraction
- Sasha Dugdale (born 1974), English poet, playwright and translator
- Nurduran Duman (born 1974), Turkish poet, writer, essayist, and translator
- Camille Dungy (born 1972), American poet and academic
- Zetta Elliott (born 1972), Canadian-American poet and playwright
- Jill Alexander Essbaum (born 1971), American poet and novelist
- Kate Fox (born 1975), English poet, writer, comedian and academic
- Marta Repullo i Grau (born 1976), Andorran poet and journalist
- Jane Griffiths (born 1970), English poet and literary historian
- Rachel Eliza Griffiths (born 1978), American poet, novelist, photographer and visual artist
- Eliza Griswold (born 1973), American journalist and poet
- Wioletta Grzegorzewska (born 1974), Polish poet and writer
- Kim Haengsook (born 1970), South Korean poet
- Sophie Hannah (born 1971), English poet and novelist
- Ilona Hegedűs (living), Hungarian poet and fiction writer
- Andrea Heuser (born 1972), German writer, poet, translator and literary scholar
- Hissa Hilal (living), Saudi Arabian poet and editor
- Joan Houlihan (living), American poet
- Sheema Kalbasi (born 1972), Iranian poet, producer, critic, blogger and human rights advocate
- Sissal Kampmann (born 1974), Faroese poet
- Saba Kidane (born 1978), Eritrean poet and journalist
- Taja Kramberger (born 1970), Slovenian poet, translator and essayist
- Evelyn Lau (born 1971), Canadian poet and novelist
- Samantha Lê (born 1974), Vietnamese-American poet and novelist
- Ágnes Lehóczky (born 1976), Hungarian translator and academic
- Ada Limón (born 1976), 24th United States Poet Laureate
- Lebogang Mashile (born 1979), South African actress, writer and performance poet
- Lili Mendoza (born 1974), Panamanian poet and writer
- Touhfat Mouhtare (living), Comoros poet and writer
- Aimee Nezhukumatathil (born 1974), American poet
- Neelam Karki Niharika (born 1975), Nepalese poet and fiction writer
- Ketty Nivyabandi (born 1978), Burundian poet and human rights activist
- Gayatribala Panda (born 1977), Indian poet, fiction writer and journalist
- Rashmi Parekh (born 1976), Indian poet and computer scientist
- Rochelle Potkar (born 1979), Indian fiction writer and poet
- Asmaa bint Saqr Al Qasimi (living), United Arab Emirates poet
- Adele Ramos (living), Belize poet, writer and journalist
- Angela Rawlings (born 1978), Canadian poet, editor, and interdisciplinary artist
- Angela Readman (born 1973), English poet
- Nandini Sahu (born 1973), Indian poet writing in English
- Ann Sansom (living), English poet and tutor
- Daniela Seel (born 1974), German poet, translator, editor and publisher
- Brenda Shaughnessy (born 1970), American poet
- Sally Singhateh (born 1977), Gambian poet and novelist
- Tracy K. Smith (born 1972), African-American poet and educator
- Geeta Tripathee (born 1972), Nepalese poet and song-writer
- Anja Utler (born 1973), German poet, essayist and translator
- Julieta Valero (born 1971), Spanish poet
- Jumoke Verissimo (born 1979), Nigerian poet and writer
- Emily Warn (living), American poet and essayist
- Uljana Wolf (born 1979), German poet and translator
- Jennifer Wong (born 1978), Chinese poet
- Yu Xiuhua (余秀华, born 1976), Chinese poet
- Eva Yárnoz (born 1975), Spanish poet
- Katarzyna Ewa Zdanowicz-Cyganiak (born 1979), Polish poet and journalist

== 1980s ==
In alphabetical order:

- Anastasia Afanasieva (born 1982), Ukrainian physician, poet, writer and translator
- Salma Khalil Alio (born 1982), Chad poet, photographer and graphic artist
- Nadia Anjuman (1980–2005), Afghan poet
- Süreyya Aylin Antmen (born 1981), Turkish writer, poet and essayist
- Wani Ardy (born 1984), Malaysian writer, poet, and singer-songwriter
- Eileen Barbosa (living), Cape Verdean poet and fiction writer
- Mara-Daria Cojocaru (born 1980), German poet and university lecturer for philosophy
- Linda M. Deane (living), English-born writer, poet and editor in Barbados
- Xenia Dyakonova (born 1985), Russian-born poet, translator, literary critic, educator living in Spain
- Kristín Eiríksdóttir (born 1981), Icelandic poet
- Fateme Ekhtesari (born 1986), Iranian poet and midwife
- Kalilah Enríquez (born 1983), Belize poet and journalist
- Kathy Jetnil-Kijiner (living), Marshall Islander/American poet and climate-change activist
- Anja Kampmann (born 1983), German poet and novelist
- Iya Kiva (born 1984), Ukrainian poet, translator, journalist, and critic
- D. L. Lang (born 1983), American poet laureate of Vallejo, California
- Joanna Lech (born 1984), Polish poet and writer
- Rossy Evelin Lima (born 1986), Mexican poet and linguist
- Wendy McGrath (living), Canadian poet and novelist
- Jennifer Militello (living), American poet and professor
- Yamilka Noa (born 1980), Cuban/Costa Rican poet and film-maker
- Vera Polozkova (born 1986), Russian poet, actor and singer
- Sophie Reyer (born 1984), Austrian author
- Tania De Rozario (born 1982), Singaporean writer and visual artist
- Warsan Shire (born 1988), British writer, poet, editor and teacher
- Tamara Štajner (born 1987), Slovenian violist and writer
- Maja Solar (born 1980), Serbian poet
- Margo Taft Stever (living), American poet
- Bogi Takács (born 1983), Hungarian poet, writer and translator
- Judith Zander (born 1980), German writer and translator

== 1990s ==
In alphabetical order:

- Amata Giramata (born 1996), Rwandan/American poet and community organizer
- Amanda Gorman (born 1998), American poet
- Fríða Ísberg (born 1992), Icelandic novelist, short story writer and poet
- Rupi Kaur (born 1992), Indian-born Canadian poet and illustrator
- Sheila Khala (born 1990 or 1991), Lesotho poet
- Melissa Lozada-Oliva (born 1992), American poet and educator
- Emtithal Mahmoud (born 1992 or 1993), Sudanese poet and activist
- Lieke Marsman (1990–2026), Dutch poet
- Slata Roschal (born 1992), German writer and literary scholar

== Current (date of birth unknown) ==
- Elizabeth Acevedo, Dominican-American poet
- Sandra Agard, British storyteller, poet and cultural historian
- Star Black, American poet, photographer and artist
- Hannah Drake, African-American poet
- Beda Higgins, Anglo-Irish poet and writer
- Kara Jackson, American poet and former National Youth Poet Laureate of the USA
- Thoko Remigia Makhanya, South African activist and poet
- Trista Mateer, American visual poet
- Monica Ong, Asian-American visual poet
- Vaishnavi Pusapati, Physician writer and poet
- Hermana Ramarui, Palauan poet and educator

== See also ==
- Poetry
- Poet
- List of feminist poets
