= List of feminist poets =

This is a list of feminist poets. Historically, literature has been a male-dominated sphere, and any poetry written by a woman could be seen as feminist. Often, feminist poetry refers to that which was composed after the 1960s and the second wave of the feminist movement. This list focuses on poets who take explicitly feminist approaches to their poetry.

== A–D ==
- Kathy Acker (1947–1997), American experimental novelist, punk poet, playwright and essayist
- Maya Angelou (1928–2014), American author and poet
- Elvia Ardalani (born 1963), Mexican poet, writer and storyteller
- Margaret Atwood (born 1939), Canadian poet, novelist and critic
- Maryam Jafari Azarmani (born 1977), Iranian poet, Sonneteer, essayist, literary critic, translator
- Addie L. Ballou (1837–1916), American poet and suffragist
- Djuna Barnes (1892–1982), American modernist lesbian writer
- Aphra Behn (1640–1689), dramatist of the English Restoration and among first English professional female writers
- Elizabeth Bishop (1911–1979), American poet and short-story writer
- Eavan Boland (1944–2020), Irish poet
- Sophia Elisabet Brenner (1659–1730), Swedish writer, poet, feminist and salon hostess
- Olga Broumas (born 1949), Greek poet living in the United States
- Lucille Clifton (1936–2010), American writer and educator
- Ellen Melicent Cobden (1848–1914), British writer, radical campaigner and suffragist
- Mary Collier (c. 1688–1762), English poet
- Jeni Couzyn (born 1942), Canadian poet and anthologist of South African extraction
- Rosemary Daniell (born 1935), American poet and author, known as a second-wave feminist and for writing about the deep south
- H.D. (Hilda Doolittle) (1886–1961), American poet, novelist and memoirist known for Imagist poetry
- Diane Di Prima (1934–2020), American poet
- Zoraida Díaz (1881–1948), Panamanian poet, educator, and feminist
- Emily Dickinson (1830–1886), American poet
- Carol Ann Duffy (born 1955), Scottish poet and playwright; first female and first Scottish Poet Laureate of the United Kingdom
- Rachel Blau DuPlessis (born 1941), American poet and essayist known as a feminist critic and scholar

== E–K ==
- Muzi Epifani (1935–1984), Italian writer and poet
- Mary Eliza Fullerton (1868–1946), Australian feminist poet, short story writer, journalist and novelist
- Alice Fulton (born 1952), American author, poet
- Frances Dana Barker Gage (1808–1884), American writer, poet, reformer, feminist and abolitionist
- Charlotte Perkins Gilman (1860–1935), American sociologist, author, poet and lecturer for social reform
- Hedwig Gorski (born 1949), American poet, author, artist, dramatist, and scholar
- Judy Grahn (born 1940), American feminist, lesbian poet
- Barbara Guest (1920–2006), American poet, author
- Marilyn Hacker (born 1942), American poet, translator and critic
- Judith Hall (born 1951), American poet, literary editor, educational writer, essayist, illustrator and educator
- Jane Eaton Hamilton (born 1954), Canadian poet, fiction writer, photographer, and visual artist
- Gwen Harwood (1920–1995), Australian poet and librettist
- Allison Hedge Coke (born 1958), American/Canadian poet
- Lyn Hejinian (born 1941), American poet, essayist, translator and publisher
- Dorothy Hewett (1923–2002), Australian feminist poet, novelist, librettist and playwright
- Susan Howe (born 1937), American poet, scholar, essayist and critic; closely associated with the Language poets
- Terri L. Jewell (1954–1995), American author, poet and Black lesbian activist
- Kiyémis (born 1993), French Afro-feminist and poet
- Carolyn Kizer (1925–2014), Pulitzer Prize-winning American poet; noted for her feminist poetry

== L–R ==
- Sue Lenier (born 1957), English poet and playwright
- Anna Maria Lenngren (1754–1817), Swedish writer, poet, feminist, translator and salonnière
- Denise Levertov (1923–1997), British-born American poet
- Patricia Lockwood (born 1982), American poet and essayist
- Audre Lorde (1934–1992), Caribbean-American writer, poet and activist
- Mina Loy (1882–1966), artist, poet, playwright and novelist, Futurist
- Chris Mansell (born 1953), Australian poet and publisher
- Edna St. Vincent Millay (1892–1950), American lyrical poet, playwright and feminist
- Gabriela Mistral (Lucila Godoy Alcayaga) (1889–1957), Chilean poet, educator and feminist; first Latin American to win Nobel Prize in Literature
- Marianne Moore (1887–1972), American Modernist poet and writer
- Barbara Mor (1936–2015), American feminist of the Goddess movement
- Robin Morgan (born 1941), American poet, author, political theorist and activist
- Eileen Myles (born 1949) American poet and writer, Guggenheim Fellowship recipient and LGBT activist
- Kishwar Naheed (born 1940), Urdu poet from Pakistan known for her pioneering feminist poetry
- Lorine Niedecker (1903–1970), American poet; only woman associated with Objectivist poets
- Barbara Noda (1953), third generation Japanese American poet
- Hedvig Charlotta Nordenflycht (1718–1763), Swedish poet, feminist and salon hostess
- Alice Notley (born 1945), American poet and feminist
- Alicia Ostriker (born 1937), American poet and scholar writing Jewish feminist poetry
- Grace Paley (1922–2007), American-Jewish short story writer, poet, and political activist
- Sylvia Pankhurst (1882–1960), English suffragist, poet
- Dorothy Parker (1893–1967), American poet, short story writer, critic and satirist
- Sylvia Plath (1932–1963), American poet, novelist and short story writer
- Katha Pollitt (born 1949), American feminist poet, essayist and critic
- Qiu Jin (1875–1907), Chinese revolutionary, feminist and writer
- Rita Mae Reese (living), American poet, fiction writer, and publisher
- Fahmida Riaz (1946–2018), Urdu writer, poet, and feminist of Pakistan
- Adrienne Rich (1929–2012), American poet, essayist and feminist
- Dorothy Richardson (1873–1957), English novelist, poet, essayist and short story writer
- Lola Ridge (1873–1941), anarchist poet and editor of avant-garde, feminist, and Marxist publications
- Ethel Rolt-Wheeler (1869–1958), English poet, author and journalist
- Christina Rossetti (1830–1894), English writer of romantic, devotional and children's poems
- Muriel Rukeyser (1913–1980), American poet and political activist

== S–Z ==
- Nandini Sahu (born 1973), Indian poet writing in English
- Sonia Sanchez (born 1934), African-American poet often associated with Black Arts Movement
- Sappho (fl. 6th century BC), Ancient Greek poet; one of the nine lyric poets
- Henriette Sauret (1890-1976), French feminist pacifist poet, writer, journalist
- Anne Sexton (1928–1974), American poet known for personal, confessional verse
- Parveen Shakir (1952–1994), Urdu poet, teacher and civil servant in Pakistan
- Jo Shapcott (born 1953), English poet, editor and lecturer
- Elena Shirman (1908–1942), Russian poet
- Edith Sitwell (1887–1964), British poet and critic, eldest of three literary Sitwells
- Stevie Smith (1902–1971), English poet and novelist
- Gertrude Stein (1874–1946), American writer, poet and art collector who spent most of life in France
- Alfonsina Storni (1892–1938), Swiss-Argentine poet
- Lynn Strongin (born 1939), American poet
- May Swenson (1913–1989), American poet and playwright
- Sara Teasdale (1884–1933), American lyrical poet
- Ann Townsend (born 1962) American poet and essayist
- Marina Tsvetaeva (1892–1941), Russian and Soviet poet
- Anne Waldman (born 1945), American poet
- Rosmarie Waldrop (born 1935), American poet, translator and publisher
- Alice Walker (born 1944), American author, poet, and activist
- Phyllis Webb (1927–2021), Canadian poet and radio broadcaster
- Nellie Wong (born 1934), Chinese-American feminist poet
- Merle Woo (born 1941), Asian-American teacher, poet and activist
- Judith Wright (1915–2000), Australian poet, environmentalist and campaigner for Aboriginal land rights
- Elinor Wylie (1885–1928), American poet and novelist
- Halima Xudoyberdiyeva (1947–2018), Uzbek poet; People's Poet of Uzbekistan
- Mitsuye Yamada (born 1923), Japanese-American activist, feminist, essayist, poet, story writer, editor, and professor
- Esperanza Zambrano (1901-1992), Mexican poet of the Modernismo movement
