= Marguerite Coppin =

Belgian poet

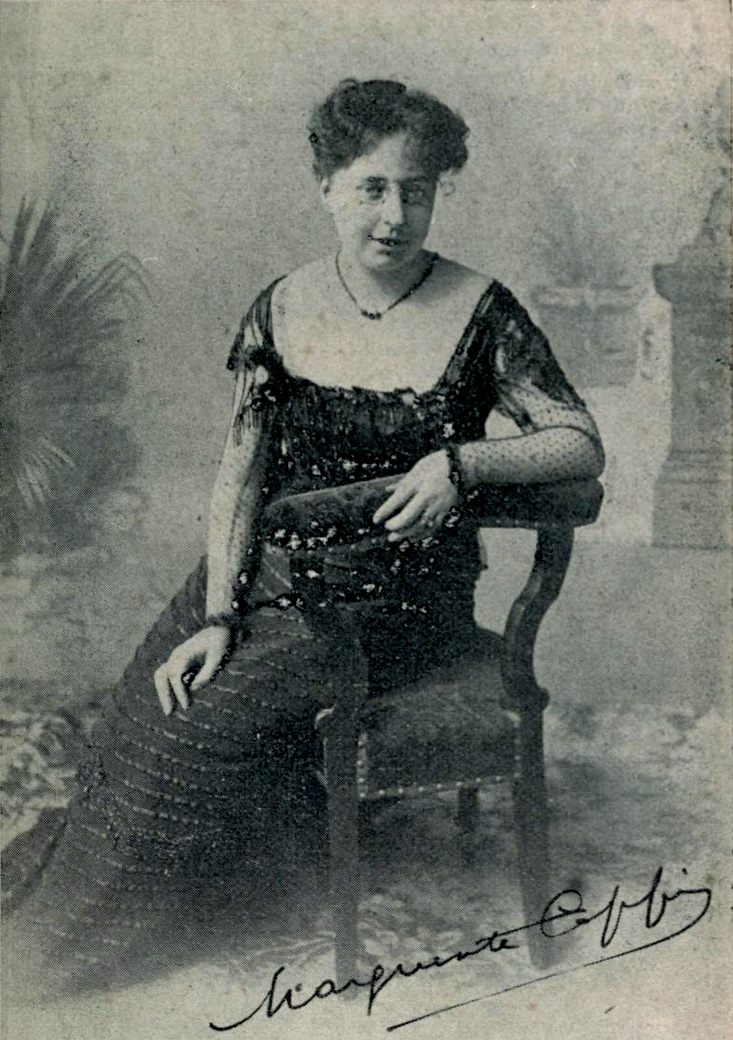
- Born: Marguerite Aimee Rosine Coppin; 2 February 1867; Brussels, Belgium
- Died: 1931 (aged 63–64); England
- Occupations: feminist, poet

Marguerite Aimee Rosine Coppin (2 February 1867 – 1931) born in Brussels, was a Belgian novelist and poet. She became a feminist and pioneer in female emancipation and equal rights for women. She was compared with women's rights activists Amelia Bloomer and Emmeline Pankhurst.

== Early life ==
Coppin was a daughter of Charles-Henri Coppin, merchant in lace, born in Wijtschate (West-Flanders) and of Marie Lehaut, born near Lille.

Coppin studied under Isabelle Gatti de Gamond and followed her teacher into activism

She became a teacher and in 1891 offered her services to a rich family in Austria. Afterward, she came to live in Bruges with her mother where they stayed until the outbreak of World War I in 1914. She taught French to the English residents.

Her first novels were published anonymously. The first, Initiation, was published as a feuilleton in La Revue de Belgique, a liberal paper, influenced by Freemasonry and freethinking.

Her novel Hors sexe occasioned a scandal. The work was seized by the public prosecutor and Coppin was accused of gross indecency. No further effect was given, but Coppin was more cautious in her expressions.

She was actively involved with French cultural life in Bruges and Brussels. She contributed to local papers such as Journal de Bruges and Le Carillon in Ostend. She lectured cultural associations such as Cercle Littéraire Excelsior as Chat Noir. She served as secretary of the Press Syndicate in Bruges, specially designated to entertain British visitors, e.g., in 1902 when a group of English journalists visited the exhibition of Flemish Primitives in Bruges.

Some citizens in Bruges were scandalized when Coppin rode a bicycle down the streets of the city with her skirts clipped to each ankle to function like trousers. The bicycle was recognized by 19th-century feminists and suffragists as a "freedom machine" for women contributing to female emancipation. "A woman on a bicycle? Brazen!" said some shocked people in Bruges according to an Australian news article published as late as 1937. Like Amelia Bloomer, Coppin devised a convenient and comfortable trouser-like garment for women to use for bicycle riding.

In 1914, with the outbreak of war Coppin fled to England where she taught French until her death in 1931.

Coppin was an adept of anthroposophy and theosophy, which is apparent in her novels. She received the award of the Orient Star, an order founded in 1914 by Rudolf Steiner and Helena Blavatsky.

After nearly a century in oblivion, Marguerite Coppin enjoyed a renewed interest and of reissue of some of her works.

== Publications ==
- Ressort cassé, 1889, feministist novel, Brussels, Kistemaekers, 1889, reedited by Mirande Lucien, Brussels, 2011.
- Le Troisième Sexe followed by Hors Sexe, Brussels, Kistemaekers, 1890, reedition of Hors Sexe by Mirande Lucien, Brussels, 2012.
- Solesme sceul aymé, 1891, novel.
- Le charme de Bruges, 1892, novel.
- Initiation, 1895, Brussels, Weissenbruch.
- Poèmes de femme, 1896, Bruges.
- Maman et autres poèmes, 1898, Ostend, Bouchery.
- Initiation nouvelle, 1898, novel.
- Le triomphal amour, 1899, novel, Ostend, Bouchery.
- Contes sur l'histoire de Belgique, 1905, Ostend, Bouchery.
- Monsieur Benoiton, docteur, 1909, novel, Liège, Société belge d'édition.
- Nouveaux poèmes, 1911, Ostend, Bouchery.
- Némésis, novel.
- Le livre du bonheur.

== See also ==
- History of feminism
- List of women's rights activists
- List of female poets
- Women's suffrage

== Sources ==
- Gustave DE L'YSER, 800 Croquis et silhouettes, 1899.
- Under the shadow of the Germans. An interview with Belgian's leading poetess, in: The Queenslander (Australië), 6 February 1915.
- Walter RAVEZ, Femmes de lettres belges, 1939.
- Bicycle Ride that Shocked People of Bruges, in: The Herald, Melbourne, 4 December 1937.
- Bibliographie des écrivains français de Belgique, T. I. Brussel, 1958.
- Fernand BONNEURE, Marguerite Coppin, in: Brugge Beschreven. Hoe een stad in teksten verschijnt, Brussel Elsevier, 1984.
- Jan SCHEPENS, Marguerite COPPIN, in: Lexicon van West-Vlaamse schrijvers, T. II, Torhout, 1985.
- Éliane GUBIN & Marie-Sylvie DUPONT-BOUCHAT, Dictionnaire des femmes belges, Tielt, Lannoo, 2006, ISBN 2-87386-434-6, ISBN 978-2-87386-434-7.
- Mirande LUCIEN, Marguerite Coppin ou l’amour hors les sens, in: Textyles, 2012.
- Corinne BLANCHAUD, Dictionnaire des écrivains francophones classiques, Belgique, Canada, Québec, Luxembourg, Suisse romande, Paris, Honoré Champion, 2013.
- Mirande LUCIEN, La femme-écrivain de province et la femme-inspiratrice dans 'Initiation' de Marguerite Coppin, in: Textyles, 2015.
- Sharon LARSON, A New Model of Femininity: Marguerite Coppin, Decadent Fiction and Belgian Girls' Education, 2016.
- Nathalie Clifford BARNEY, Women lovers or the Third Woman (1926), Edited and Translated by Chelsea Ray, University of Wisconsin Press, 2016.
