= Wendy McGrath =

Canadian poet and novelist

Wendy McGrath is a Métis Canadian writer and artist. She was the inaugural winner of the $50,000 Prairie Grindstone Prize (2023-2024).

== Career ==
McGrath's most recent poetry collection The Beauty of Vultures (NeWest Press 2025) is inspired by and includes the bird and wildlife photography of musician and photographer Danny Miles. Broke City (NeWest Press 2019) is the final novel in McGrath's Santa Rosa Trilogy. The second novel in the trilogy, North East (NeWest Press 2014) was nominated for the Georges Bugnet Prize for Fiction. The Santa Rosa Trilogy is set primarily in Edmonton, Alberta circa 1960s. Santa Rosa, the first book in the series, was nominated for the 2012 Robert Kroetsch City of Edmonton Book Prize.

McGrath collaborated with musician/producer Sascha Liebrand on the album "Before We Knew" (Entity Records 2019)--a spoken word collection set to Liebrand's music/arrangements. McGrath released the EP BOX (spring 2017) with the group Quarto & Sound—made up of Edmonton musicians Sascha Liebrand, Yana Loo, and writer McGrath. BOX is an adaptation of McGrath's eponymous "mirror poem"—a collaboration of poetry, jazz, spoken word, instrumental experimental music, and voice. Quarto & Sound is currently working on an arrangement and adaptation of McGrath's long poem inspired by the North Saskatchewan River.

McGrath's poetry collection A Revision of Forward (NeWest Press 2015) is the culmination of a decade-long poetry/print collaboration with printmaker Walter Jule, who also contributed cover art for McGrath's first book common place ecstasies (Beach Holme Publishing 2000). A Revision of Forward launched at Edmonton's SNAP Gallery in October, 2015. Natalie Olsen received an Honourable Mention Alcuin Society Award for Excellence in Book Design for her design work on the book, which incorporated image fragments from Jule's prints.

Recurring Fictions (University of Alberta Press 2002), McGrath's first novel, is an experimental work chronicling the history of a Canadian family. The plot structure of this novel is non-linear, with shifts in narrative viewpoint and time. The first line of the novel, "Johnny Cash played the harmonica imitating the sound of trains" hints at one of the novel's recurring motifs. The often poetic style of this novel is multi-layered with spaces in the text and on pages providing literal and figurative openings for the reader to enter the world of the narrator(s). Short fragments of the text are also repeated at the bottom of some of the pages.

Her first book of poetry, common place ecstasies (Beach Holme Publishing, 2000), explores themes of home, and childhood. A long poem, "Preserving," which is included in this collection was also published in chapbook form by Rubicon Press (February 2011). "Preserving" uses found portions of text extracted from a home canning pamphlet as a springboard for poetic narrative that tells the multi-generational story of prairie women. As noted on the Rubicon Press website: "McGrath's grandmother gave her that brochure and it was a palimpsest of sorts, with notes on the recipes and unexpected doodles penciled in. Publications like that brochure, as well as cookbooks, seemed to be in the background of her grandmothers' and her mother's lives when she was growing up. But, when she encountered these texts as an adult, their meaning became quite different."

McGrath's fiction, creative non-fiction, and poetry has appeared in numerous literary journals and anthologies locally, nationally, and internationally.

== Sources ==
- Colbert, Jade (2 October 2019). "Review: Wendy McGrath's Santa Rosa trilogy is done, and proves why she's a writer to pay attention to". The Globe and Mail.
