= Asmaa bint Saqr Al Qasimi =

- Born: 24 December
- Education: B.A in Political Science and Economics
- Occupation: Poet

Asmaa bint Saqr Al Qasimi (Arabic: سمو الشيخة الشاعرة أسماء بنت صقر القاسمي; born 24 December in Kalba, Sharjah, United Arab Emirates) is an Emirati poet. As of 2013 she had published 5 poetry books. In addition to philosophy and comparative religious studies, she gained a B.A in Political Science and Economics.

== Background ==
Asmaa bint Saqr Al Qasimi is the founder and CEO of Sadana Foundation for Thought and Literature. She is a member of the World Poetry Movement in Chile and a sponsor of the Encyclopaedia of Arab Poets. Her poems have been translated into English, French, and Spanish.

She is a daughter of a former governor of Sharjah Emirate, Sheikh Saqr Al Qasimi. In addition to Sadana Foundation, she is the president of Kalba Sporting and Cultural Club for Girls. Sheikha Asmaa Al Qasimi is an honorary member of a number of local, regional, and international clubs for literature such as: The International League of Islamic Literature, The House of Poetry of Morocco, Fonxe Academy for Arabic Poetry, among others.

== Publications ==
- In the Temple of Sorrow (2008)
- Ishtar Prayer (2008)
- Gemstones of my Blood (2009) In Spanish and Arabic
- A Perfume's Whiff (2009) in English, Spanish, and Arabic
- A Crucible of Musk (2010)
- Tayrason Nostalgia (2013) in English, French, and Arabic
