= Chay Douangphouxay =

American poet

- Known for: National Asian Pacific American Women's Forum.
- Notable work: Tawan: The Sun Girl
- Awards: Legacy Fellowship Grant

Chay Douangphouxay is a Lao-Khmer American artist and activist from Minneapolis. Douangphouxay is a spoken word artist known for covering topics such as race and gender. Through her art, she has sought to redefine the image of Asian-Americans.

== Personal life ==
Before coming to the United States, Douangphouxay and her family lived in Thai refugee camps from when she was one to three. She has said that America was "the light at the end of the tunnel for us." Her work is inspired by both her time in the refugee camps and her childhood in the projects of Minnesota.

== Career ==
Her first solo chapbook, Remission: Finding Light in the Midst of Social Darkness, was released in 2012 through the 2012 Legacy Fellowship Grant, with the support of Council on Asian Pacific Minnesotans and the Minnesota Humanities Center. The book covers topics of gender, race, and class. Her second book, Tawan: The Sun Girl, was published in 2013 as part of the Reading Together project, a collaboration of the Minnesota Humanities Center and the Council on Asian Pacific Minnesotans.

Douangphouxay also cofounded the Twin Cities chapter of the National Asian Pacific American Women's Forum.
