= Barbara Noda =

Japanese American poet

- Born: January 14, 1953 (age 73)
- Occupation: Poet
- Writing career
- Genre: Poetry

Barbara Noda (January 14, 1953), is a third generation Japanese American poet. Noda draws upon her experience as a Japanese American Lesbian and Feminism, and also advocates for LGBTQ rights in the San Francisco Bay Area.

== Career ==
She is a contributor to the renowned feminist collection, This Bridge Called My Back. She wrote the passage in section four of This Bridge Called My Back entitled Lowriding Through the Women's Movement.

In 1979, she published a collection of poems entitled Strawberries that was published by Shameless Hussy Press. Joy Parks wrote in The Body Politic that Strawberries "combines a passion for the music of language and a need for simplicity in art, a concept rooted within the poet's cultural heritage". She argues the poems in this collection "run the risk of sounding naive because they do not attempt to dazzle the reader with clever imagery, but depend on the simple sounds of the language to pose their message":

your outstretched arms
and your first whisper
are all I know of morning

"The simple language allows the poet to show herself more closely in the poem. The distancing techniques of more complicated devices would distill Noda's message and weaken the work". Parks opines that Noda may not be the "poet for everyone", but her poetry is "important for readers interested in the purity of language and those tired of intellectualized polemics".

In June 1981, the Asian American Theater Company in San Francisco presented Noda's one-act play Aw Shucks, about three stereotypical women devoted to pleasure, money and spirituality.

== See also ==
- Lesbian literature
- List of female poets
- List of LGBT rights activists
