= Marianne Bruns =

German novelist and poet

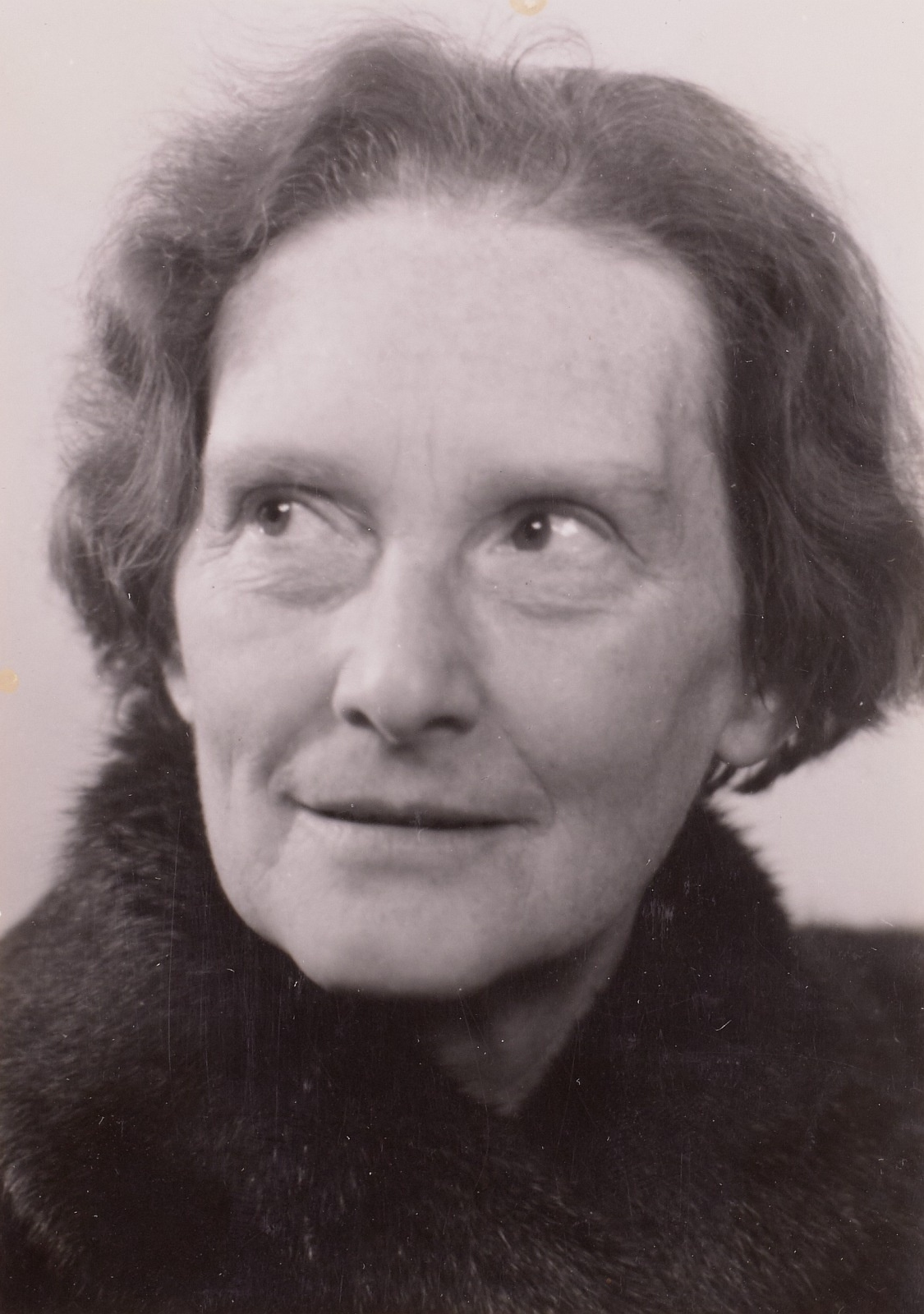
- Bruns in Berlin, 1956
- Born: 31 August 1897 Leipzig, German Empire
- Died: 1 January 1994 (aged 96) Dresden, Germany

Marianne Bruns (31 August 1897 – 1 January 1994) was a twentieth-century German novelist and poet.

== Biography ==
Bruns was born in Leipzig. After studying music, she began writing stories for magazines, and then novels. Starting in 1929, she also became a broadcaster on the German radio, often reading from her poetry on programs designed for women and children. She died in Dresden.

== Works ==
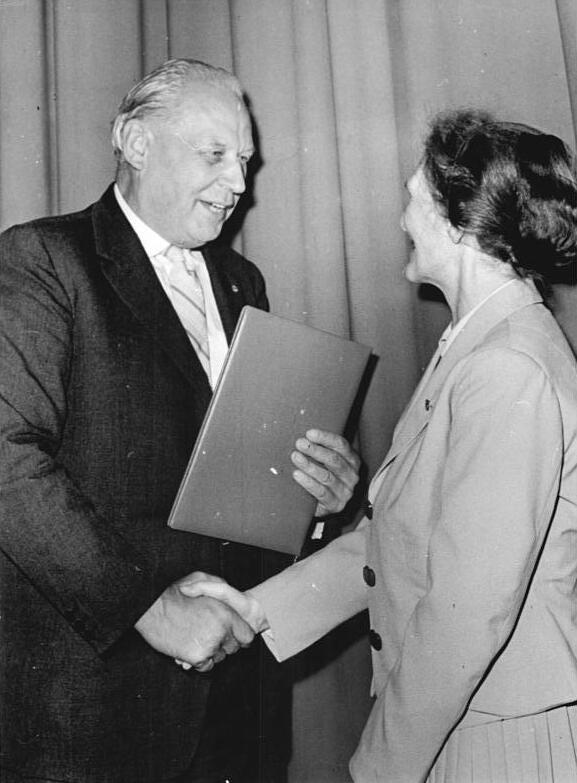
Bruns with Herbert Warnke in 1961

=== Fiction ===
- Telemachos, Novelle, 1927
- Das rechtschaffene Herz, Roman, 1939
- Über meinen grünen Garten fliegen die Schwalben, Roman, 1940
- Die Tochter der Parze, Roman, 1943
- Flugsamen, Roman, 1948
- Wiegand der Feuerträger, 1949
- Die Spur des namenlosen Malers, 1975 (historical novel about Jerg Ratgeb)

=== Children's books ===
- Jau und Trine laden ein, 1933
- Die Schwedin und die drei Indianer, 1934
- Willi und Kamilla. Zwei Kinder wachsen heran, 1935
- Das verschwundene Messer, Laienspiel für Kinder, 1949

=== Non-Fiction ===
- Seliger Kreislauf. Gedichte, 1925
- ed.: Jean Paul, Ausgewählte Werke, 1925
- Reise durch Schweden, 1926
- Die Dioskuren in Olympia. Roman, 1936 (rep in 1937 as: Die Auserwählten. Roman aus Alt-Griechenland)
- Tobbys Buch. Eine Theatergeschichte, 1949
- Geht Christel Peters zur Bühne? 1951
- Uns hebt die Flut, 1952 (about the beginnings of the women's movement)
- Glück fällt nicht vom Himmel, 1954
- Darüber wächst kein Gras, 1956
- Bauer und Richter, 1956
- Deutsche Stimmen 1956. Neue Prosa und Lyrik aus Ost und West, 1956
- Frau Doktor privat, 1957
- Der Junge mit den beiden Namen, 1958
- Die Silbergrube, 1959
- Das ist Diebstahl, 1960
- ed.: Briefe aus Zittau, 1960
- Schuldig befunden, 1961
- Zwischen Pflicht und Kür, 1962
- Hausfrauenbrigade. Eine Szene, 1962
- Verständnis für die Neunte, 1962
- Die Lichtung, 1965
- Der neunte Sohn des Veit Stoß, 1967
- Großaufnahme leicht retuschiert, 1972
- Zeichen ohne Wunder, 1977
- Der grüne Zweig, 1979
- Szenenwechsel, 1982
- Luftschaukel, 1985
- Wiedersehen, 1987
- Nahe Ferne, 1989
