= Nafija Sarajlić =

Bosnian writer (1893-1970)

- Born: Nafija Hadžikarić; 3 October 1893; Sarajevo, Ottoman Empire
- Died: 15 January 1970 (aged 76); Sarajevo, Yugoslavia
- Occupation: Author

Nafija Sarajlić (née Hadžikarić; 3 October 1893 – 15 January 1970) was a Bosnian writer, the first female prose writer.

== Early life ==
Nafija Hadžikarić was born around 1893 in Sarajevo, Bosnia and Herzegovina, into a Bosnian Muslim family of fine craftsmen. She was one of eight children—three sons and five daughters. Her father Avdija Hadžikarić did not hesitate to educate his female children, an unusual act among Muslims in the 19th century. His five daughters were educated in Sarajevo to become teachers, albeit under unfavorable circumstances; doing homework by the light of tallow candles and walking great lengths daily to school. After allowing his daughters to be educated, her father could not enter the Baščaršija for months without being confronted about it or having rocks thrown at him. Nafija worked for three years as an elementary school teacher.

Immediately before the breakout of World War I Sarajlić began publishing her short stories that she called Teme (Themes) through publisher Bekir Kalajdžić. Her first story Rastanak was published in the Mostar-based magazine Zeman in 1912. The rest of her short stories were published in the magazine Biser, with full support from the editor Musa Ćazim Ćatić.

Sarajlić died on 15 January 1970 in Sarajevo. Shortly after her death, writer Alija Isaković said "When she died, quietly as she had lived, no one except a small number of friends and admirers, knew that the first prose writer among Muslim women had died."

== Works ==
Sarajlić, as the sole representative of Bosnian literature in the Austro-Hungarian period, matched the literary tendencies of that period even though she stayed in the literary world very briefly. She published a collection of stories before and during the First World War. The literature itself in this historical period tried to Europeanize the Bosnian culture and its people in accordance with the spirit of the new times. Between 1912 and 1918. she published 23 short stories.

In 1978, writer Muris Idrizović said that her Teme series "appear as live observations" and said that Sarajlić was an "observer of life, an analyst". Her work covered multiple topics and social issues of the time: the displacement of Bosniaks during World War I, superstition, poverty, and social backwardness.

Selected works include

- Rastanak (1912)
- Nekoliko stranica tebi (1918)
- Kokošija pamet
- Kamen na cesti
- Jedan čas
- Ustaj ženo (poem)
