= Afira bint 'Abbad =

3rd-century Arab poet of Arabia

- عَفِيرة بنت عبَّاد
- Born: Arabia
- Died: Arabia
- Occupation: Arabic Poet
- Writing career
- Pen name: Afira
- Language: Arabic
- Period: Third Century

Afira bint 'Abbad (Arabic: عَفِيرة بنت عبَّاد) was an Arab poet from around the 3rd century CE, from what is now Bahrain.

Her poems viscerally express rage and demand justice and action from men, after she had been raped. According to legend, the perpetrator was the Tasmi king, who, similar the droit du siegneur, sexually assaulted all Jadisi brides. Afira's poems excoriated Jadisi men for permitting this to happen, and her words drove an uprising against the Tasmi king.

== Anthologies ==
Moris Farhi (ed) Classical Poems by Arab Women translated Abdullah al-Udhari, Saqi Books, 1999. ISBN 086356-096-2
