= Yamilka Noa =

Yamilka Noa (born 31 July 1980) is a Cuban-Costa Rican poet and filmmaker, awarded five times by "Nosside World Poetry Prize" (Italy). Her works have been translated into three languages.

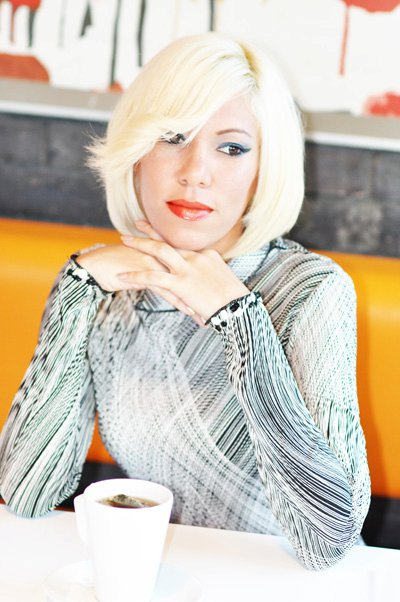
Yamilka Noa by Tim Dourado, London 2009

Her poems have been published in several literary journals and magazines including AN, Isla Negra, Poetas del mundo, Guatini, Cinosargo, Arcane Radio, and Radio Momentos, "El País".

== Life ==
Her career as a poet began In 2006 when she self-published her book "La pasión detrás de la ventana", although she started writing at a very young age. In 2021 she moved to Costa Rica. She became Costa Rican citizen in 2010 while living in London United Kingdom, where she studied from 2009 until 2013. She graduated from University of West London majoring in Film Production.

She is, simultaneously, member of multiple literary groups including Global Writers in Spanish/REMES network; Poetas del mundo; La Voz de la Palabra Escrita International; Mi Literatura; Poesía sin genero; Mi Arte; El poder de la palabra; Cerca de ti, Artes Poeticas, Punto Hispano, LetrasKiltras, Creatividad Internacional.

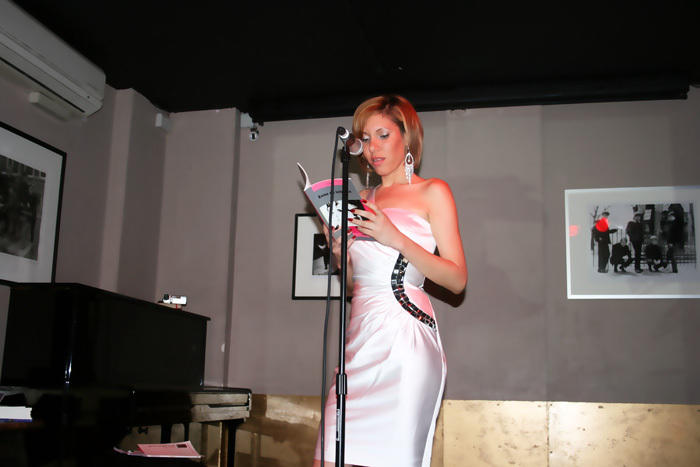
Yamilka reading from her first English book "Echoes of sorrow", London 2010

Her father, Pedro M. Calzadilla Guevara, who was also a poet, died in 2008. In 2009 she introduced her book "Mi miedo sólo mío", in the Barbican Centre and paid tribute to her father.

Her father's book 'Amor Furtivo' was recently published.

== Prizes ==
- Five special mentions (Including a medal) in the Nosside Poetry Prize competition (2007, 2008, 2009, 2010, 2011 for her video poem 'Insomnio'), an International Multilingual and Multimedia Award for previously unpublished work. Best Performance by a performer working in English and another language by Farrago Zoo Awards, 2010.

== Anthologies ==
- World Poets Society
- Unesco World Poetry Directory (Nosside prize) in Spanish.
- World Erotic Poetry Anthology (1st edition) "Blessed be your body" in Spanish "Bendito sea tu cuerpo"
- "The Agony of Nirvana" In Spanish "La Agonía del Nirvana"
- “Sotto l’arbole di Natale "1001 Poems" in Spanish.
- Antología Punto G

== Bibliography ==
- La pasión detrás de la ventana] (2007)
- Travesuras del alma (2008)
- Mi miedo sólo mío 2008, Dexeo Editores in Spanish, 2009 Libertà Edizione, ISBN 978-88-96728-15-4
- Ecos de tristeza (2010) translated by Laura P. Burns ISBN 979-8366676380
- Anthology 'La que fui y la que soy", 2010
- Love and Despair, 2020
- ¿Podré dormir mañana?, 2023
- No cerrare los ojos, 2023
- Libélula desnuda, 2023
