= Lili Mendoza =

Panamanian writer (born 1974)

Lili Mendoza (born January 15, 1974, as Lilia Ester Mendoza Peregrina in Panama City, Panama) is a Panamanian writer and columnist. Her short stories and poems have been published in literary magazines and international anthologies. Her direct prose depicts the absurdity of contemporary Panamanian society. She received the Yolanda Oreamuno Central American Fiction Award in 2009. Corazón Charol A-go-gó (in English, 'The Patent Leather Heart A-go-go') is her first book, published in 2009. She participated in the University of Iowa's International Writing Program Fall Residency (IWP, 2013), and was the first international writer in residence at Richard Stockton College, New Jersey in 2013. She has taught creative writing workshops in Panama City.

== Career ==
Short stories from the Patent Leather Heart A-go-go have been featured in Revista Literaria La Maga, Panama's leading literary magazine, published by the Panamanian University of Technology. Also in El Guayacán Magazine and Soho Magazine. In the United States, stories from the same book have been included in Their Own Words (ISBN 0-9654136-8-3, 2010), an international anthology of Generation X Fiction. Ghetto Baby, also from her first book, was part of the Cuotidiano Exhibit featured in the Libera Repubblica delle Arti e delle Culture – Festa del Salvino, in Florence, Italy, 2012. The book was the subject of a documentary filmed by Libelula Films, students of Ganexa, the Panamanian University of Fine Arts and renowned local film maker Jhoram Moya in 2010. The story Polaroid appeared in the anthology 'Tiempo al Tiempo' by Enrique Jaramillo Levi (Editorial Tecnologica, Panama 2012).

Mendoza is recipient of the Yolanda Oreamuno Central American Fiction Award, awarded by the Costa Rican Writers Guild in 2009 for her short story Todas Nosotras tus Voces (in English, All of us, your voices). The story narrates the deterioration of a daughter's relationship with her mentally-ill mother. The story was published in the Káñina, the Literary Magazine of the University of Costa Rica and in the Anthology 'Con sólo tu nombre y un poco de silencio' (Universidad Tecnologica de Panama, Panama, 2012). The story was featured in a series of lectures on new Latin American fiction at the Cervantes Institute in Warsaw, Poland, on April 1, 2011. Also published in 'Suelta' Literary Magazine, Madrid, Spain in May 2012.

Some of her poems were published in 'Me Vibra', a brief anthology of Chilean and Panamanian poetry, published by Paracaidas Editores, Lima, Peru in 2001. Other stories, articles and poems have been published in local newspapers and magazines as well as electronic media.

== Publications ==
- Corazón de Charol A-go-gó, The Fair Edition, Edición 0, Editorial la hoja. ISBN 978-9962-00-740-1, 2009. Printed by Selloarte, S.A. (Panama)
- Corazón de Charol A-go-gó, La Primera Edición, Editorial la hoja. ISBN 978-9962-00-740-1, 2010. Printed by Selloarte, S.A. (Panama)
- Corazón de Charol A-go-gó, La Segunda, Editorial la hoja. ISBN 978-9962-00-740-1, 2010. Printed by Selloarte, S.A. (Panama)
