= Julia Palmer =

- Born: Julia Hungerford; 1600s
- Died: 1673 or later
- Known for: poetry
- Spouse: Thomas Palmer
- Children: Stephen Palmer

Julia Palmer (1600s – 1673 or later) was an English author of dissenting poetry.

== Life ==
Palmer's birthplace and date are unknown but she is thought to have married on 12 May 1664 at All Hallows, London Wall. She married Thomas Palmer and her birth name is said to be Hungerford. Three years later they had their son, Stephen, baptised at St Margaret's, Westminster. After this she is presumed to have become a Presbyterian as there are no further records. Her husband may have preached and have died in 1681.

Between 1671 and 1673 she wrote over 200 poems that were dedicated to a well known apothecary named Joseph Biscoe. Biscoe was a non-conformist and he went on to lead the Society of Apothecaries. Her son Samuel was an apprentice apothecary known to the Society of Apothecaries.

In 2001 her work was published as The 'Centuries' of Julia Palmer edited by Elizabeth Clarke and Victoria Elizabeth Burke.
