= Shaïda Zarumey =

Nigerien sociologist and poet

- Born: Fatouma Agnès Diaroumèye; 1938 (age 87–88); Bamako, Mali
- Occupations: Poet; Sociologist
- Writing career
- Genre: Poetry

Shaïda Zarumey (born Fatouma Agnès Diaroumèye, 1938) is a Nigerien sociologist and poet, one of the first in her country to write in French.

Born in Bamako to a Nigerien father and a Malian mother, Diaroumèye spent the first ten years of her life in Niger, where she completed her primary studies. She continued her education in Mali before obtaining a doctorate in Paris in 1970. A socioeconomist by training, she began working in Dakar at the Institut Africain de Développement Économique et de Planification of the United Nations, where she was employed from 1970 to 1975; she then became a functionary dedicated to women's rights. She has traveled widely in support of her work. As a poet, under the pen name Shaïda Zarumey, she published Alternances pour le sultan in 1981.
