= Magie Faure-Vidot =

Seychellois poet

Magie Faure-Vidot (also known as Mrs. Maggie Vijay-Kumar or Magic Mags) is a French-language poet from the Seychelles who has also published work in English and Seychellois Creole. She is regional director for East Africa and Asia at the writers forum, Motivational Strips. She is also a member of the Institut Académique de Paris and the Académie Internationale de Lutèce. She has received prizes including the Coupe de la Ville de Paris, a Lyre d'honneur, and medals in various international literary competitions. Her work has been discussed in critical studies of Seychellois literature, and she has gained recognition as an oral performer. Her work has been featured at national and international poetry and literary festivals.

== Life and career ==
Magie Faure-Vidot was born in Victoria, Seychelles, and has lived in Lebanon, England, Italy, and France. In the Seychelles, Faure-Vidot co-founded the online literary review Vents Alizés and the online publishing house Edisyon Losean Endyen, both of which she runs with Hungarian poet Károly Sándor Pallai. She has published her work in Seychelles Nation and The People, and she is the chief editor and director of publication of Sipay, the only Seychellois International literary magazine. Faure-Vidot is heavily engaged in the cultural life of her country, and she has shown her work at exhibitions of art by local women. Her poems were published in the international poetry anthology Amaravati Poetic Prism in India. In 2017, 2018, and 2019, she received the Seychelles Arts Award in literature for her literary work.

She is a member of the World Nations Writers Union (WNWU) in Kazakhstan, and is a regional director and a board member of the Motivational Strips, an international writers forum.

== Works ==
- Whispers of Souls/Murmures des âmes by Les Éditions du Net, France, 2020. Whispers of Souls in libraries (WorldCat catalog)
- The Enchanting Rebirth/ Une Renaissance Magique, Arthee Editions 2019.
- L'Oasis des mots, Victoria, Edisyon Losean Endyen, 2016.
- Rêves créoles, Victoria, Edisyon Losean Endyen, 2012.
- Flamme mystique, Victoria, Yaw Enterprises, 2011. Flamme mystique in libraries (WorldCat catalog)
- L'âme errante, Victoria, Printec Press Holdings, 2003.
- Un grand cœur triste, Paris, La Pensée Universelle, 1984. Un grand cœur triste in libraries (WorldCat catalog)
