= Pascale Quao-Gaudens =

Ivorian writer and artist

- Born: Pascale; 1963 (age 62–63); Abidjan
- Citizenship: Ivorian
- Occupations: Painter,writer, poet , artist

Pascale Quao-Gaudens (sometimes Pascale Quao-Gaudens Clavreuil) (born 1963) is an Ivorian writer and artist.

== Biography ==
Born in Abidjan, Quao-Gaudens studied in her native country before traveling to France for higher education. She chose to study the plastic arts, and went to Paris in 1986, there working as an illustrator for a number of editors. She also took a position as a secretary and editor with Bordas. Later, she returned to Abidjan to run a bookstore and art gallery. She has published a volume of poetry and a book for children. Her work has been exhibited in her home country, and her poetry has been anthologized and translated into English.
