= Gelanesh Haddis =

Ethiopian teacher and scholar in the Ethiopian Orthodox Church

- Born: 1896
- Died: 1986 (aged 89–90)
- Occupation: Poet

Gelanesh Haddis (1896 – 1986) was a teacher and scholar in the Ethiopian Orthodox Church. She was known for her skill with the complex Ethiopian style of poetry called qene.

== Biography ==
Haddis was born in Silalo in the Ethiopian province of Gojjam in 1896. Her father, Haddis Kinan, was an expert in a type of Ethiopian poetry called qene. At the age of eight years old, Haddis lost her sight. Her father taught her qene, which was unusual at the time due to her gender and her disability.

Haddis began teaching alongside her father at the school in Silalo. During the Italian invasion of Ethiopia, her father was executed by the invading forces.

== Career ==
After the death of her father, Haddis taught in her own right and over two thousand pupils came to study with her during her career. She also trained 150 new qene teachers.

About Qene Interview 1

Haddis became an expert in qene in her own right, as well as becoming an expert in another Ethiopian literary form: andimta. Andimta involves memorising biblical interpretations from the past and repeating them to new audiences. In order to be able to memorise them, like Haddis, a teacher had to have an excellent knowledge of the Bible already. However, it is for the qene form that Haddis is remembered, for the tone of her sung recitations and her compositions. She was particularly noted for her use of qene metre. She was even referred to as "the Ethiopian Homer."

== Family ==
Haddis married and had three children, but one child died very young.

== Legacy ==
Haddis broke gender barriers by becoming a qene teacher, a role that was usually preserved for men. To remember her a museum was established in Bahir Dar, on the shores of Lake Tana, where visitors can consult her poetry.
