= Olga Broumas =

Greek poet

Olga Broumas (born 6 May 1949, Hermoupolis) is a Greek poet, resident in the United States. She has been Poet-in-Residence and Director of Creative Writing at Brandeis University since 1995.

== Biography ==
Born and raised on the island of Syros, Broumas secured a fellowship through the Fulbright program to study in the United States at the University of Pennsylvania. There, she earned her bachelor's degree in architecture. She later went on to earn a Master of Fine Arts degree from the University of Oregon.

After earning this degree, Broumas co-founded and taught at Freehand, Inc., a school in Provincetown, Massachusetts for female writers and artists. The school disbanded in 1987.

Broumas has worked in the creative writing programs at several universities, including the University of Idaho and Goddard College. She currently is the Professor Emerita of the Practice of English at Brandeis University.

== Works and honours ==
Her first collection of poems, Beginning with O, was considered groundbreaking in its depiction of explicit lesbian sexuality. Broumas was selected by Stanley Kunitz for the Yale Younger Poets Series in 1977, the first non-native speaker of English to receive this award. Other honors have included a Guggenheim Fellowship and a fellowship from the National Endowment for the Arts.

== Bibliography ==
=== Collections ===
- Beginning with O (Yale, 1977).
- Soie Sauvage (Copper Canyon Press, 1979).
- Pastoral Jazz (Copper Canyon Press, 1983).
- With Jane Miller: Black Holes, Black Stockings (Wesleyan, 1985).
- Perpetua (Copper Canyon Press, 1989).
- With T. Begley: Sappho’s Gymnasium (Copper Canyon Press, 1994).
- Rave: Poems, 1975-1999 (Copper Canyon Press, 1999).

=== Translations ===
- What I Love: Selected Poems by Odysseas Elytis (Copper Canyon Press, 1986).
- The Little Mariner by Odysseas Elytis (Copper Canyon Press, 1988).
- Eros, Eros, Eros: Selected and Last Poems by Odysseas Elytis (Copper Canyon Press,1998).
