= Zoraida Díaz =

Panamanian poet and educator

Zoraida Díaz Chamize
- Zoraida Díaz, 1911
- Born: March , 1881; Las Tablas, Panama State, United States of Colombia
- Died: June 1948 (aged 67); Panama City, Panama
- Other names: Zoraida Díaz de Schtronn
- Occupation(s): poet, teacher
- Organization: Centro Feminista Renovación
- Notable work: Nieblas de Alma

Zoraida Díaz Chamize (March 1881 – June 14, 1948), better known as Zoraida Díaz de Schtronn, was a Panamanian poet and educator. She is considered the first woman to publish a book of poetry in Panama.

== Biography ==
Díaz was born in 1881 in Las Tablas in what was then the Department of Panama, although her birth year is sometimes given as 1880. She was the daughter of Francisco Díaz Medina and Carolina Chamize de Díaz. She went to primary school in her home city, but for secondary school she moved to the capital, where she studied to be a teacher at the normal school there.

She then returned to Las Tablas to begin working as a teacher, where she also created a night school program for illiterate residents of the city. However, powerful city leaders felt threatened by her literacy program, and she lost her job as a consequence.

When she was 17 years old, Díaz wed Eleazar Escobar Restrepo, a Colombian teacher who was the mayor of Las Tablas at the time. But she was widowed shortly thereafter when her husband was killed in the Thousand Days' War. His death was followed by that of her younger daughter, who was only 2 years old.

In this period, Díaz began writing poetry, publishing verses in magazines and newspapers both in Panama and abroad. She also returned to teaching, serving as director of the Chitré School before returning to teach in Las Tablas. She later worked as a teacher at a boys' school in Panama City.

In 1915, she married again. But her new husband, the Spanish businessman Pedro Ross, died only a few weeks later, of a brain condition.

After Ross' untimely death, Díaz decided to start fresh and found work at the National Archives of Panama, where she remained until her retirement. She wed a third time in 1918, to the Russian Mendel S. Schtronn, a marriage that lasted until his death.

Most Panamanian poetry of the period was published in periodicals, with very few books released. However, in 1922 Díaz became the first Panamanian woman to publish a book of verse, Nieblas del Alma. Her second book, Cuadros, followed in 1937. She was part of a generation of Panamanian poets who focused on themes of independence and national identity, and her work is sometimes considered part of the Modernist wave.

Díaz was also a founding member of Panama's first feminist organization, the Centro Feminista Renovación. In 1923, she participated as a delegate in the country's First Feminist Congress, and she was an officer in the Feminist National Party.

In 1946, Díaz suffered a stroke that left her nearly paralyzed; a second stroke in 1947 left her nearly blind. She died in Panama City in 1948.

== Selected works ==
- Nieblas del Alma (1922)
- Cuadros (1937)
