= Culture of Panama =

Panamanian culture is a hybrid of European, specifically Spanish, Native Panamanian, and African culture. For example, the tamborito is a Spanish dance that was blended with Native Panamanian rhythms and dance moves. Dance is a symbol of the diverse cultures that have coupled in Panama. The local folklore can be experienced through a multitude of festivals, dances and traditions that have been handed down from generation to generation.

== Cuisine ==
Panamanian cuisine is a mix of Spanish, Native Panamanian, and African techniques, dishes, and ingredients, reflecting its diverse population. Since Panama is a land bridge between two continents, it has a large variety of tropical fruits, vegetables and herbs that are used in native cooking.

Typical Panamanian foods are mildly flavored, without the pungency of some of Panama's Latin American and Caribbean neighbors. Common ingredients are corn, rice, wheat flour, plantains, yuca (cassava), beef, chicken, pork and seafood.

== Literature ==
Panamanian historian and essayist Rodrigo Miró (1912–1996) cites Gonzalo Fernández de Oviedo y Valdés as the author of the first Panamanian literary work, the story of a character named Andrea de la Roca, which was published as part of the "Historia General y Natural de Las Indias" (1535). However, the first manifestations of literature written in Panama come from the 17th century with the title of "Llanto de Panamá a la muerte de don Enrique Enríquez" (Crying from Panama at the Death of Don Enrique Enríquez). Although this anthology was formed during the Colony, most of the poems in it were written by authors born in Panama.

Other Panamanian writers working during Spanish Colony: Mateo Rosas de Oquendo, author of an autobiographic romance; Juan de Miramontes y Zuázola, author of "Armas Antárticas" (Antarctic Weapons); Juan de Páramo y Cepeda, author of "Alteraciones del Dariel" (Dariel Alterations); and others.

During the 19th century, the romantics: Manuel María Ayala (1785–1824) and Tomás Miró Rubini (1800–1881). Subsequently appeared José María Alemán (1830–1887), Gil Colunje (1831–1899), Tomás Martín Feuillet (1832–1899), José Dolores Urriola (1834–1883), Amelia Denis de Icaza (1836–1911), Manuel José Pérez (1837–1895), Jerónimo de la Ossa (1847–1907), Federico Escobar (1861–1912) and Rodolfo Caicedo (1868–1905).

The modernists: Darío Herrera (1870–1914), León Antonio Soto (1874–1902), Guillermo Andreve (1879–1940), Ricardo Miró (1883–1940), Gaspar Octavio Hernández (1893–1918), María Olimpia de Obaldía (1891–1985), and Demetrio Korsi (1899–1957).

The Avant-garde movement: Rogelio Sinán (1902–1994), Ricardo J. Bermúdez (1914–), Mario Augusto Rodríguez (1917–2009), José María Núñez (1894–1990), Stella Sierra, Roque Javier Laurenza, Ofelia Hooper, Tobías Díaz Blaitry (1919–2006), Moisés Castillo (1899–1974), Gil Blas Tejeira (1901–1975), Alfredo Cantón (1910–1967), José María Sánchez (1918–1973), Ramón H. Jurado (1922–1978), Joaquín Beleño (1921), Carlos Francisco Changmarín (1922), Jorge Turner (1922), and Tristán Solarte (1924)

Working during the second half of the 20th century: Tristán Solarte (1934), José de Jesús Martínez, Diana Morán (1932), Alvaro Menéndez Franco (1932), José Guillermo Ross-Zanet (1930), José Franco (1931), Elsie Alvarado de Ricord (1928–2005), Benjamín Ramón (1939), Bertalicia Peralta (1939), Ramón Oviero (1939–2008), Moravia Ochoa López (1941), Dimas Lidio Pitty (1941–2015), Roberto Fernández Iglesias (1941), Eric Arce (1942), Enrique Jaramillo Levi (1944), Jarl Ricardo Babot (1945), Ernesto Endara (1932), Enrique Chuez (1934), Justo Arroyo (1936), Rosa María Britton (1936), Victoria Jiménez Vélez (1937), Pedro Rivera (1939), Gloria Guardia (1940), Dimas Lidio Pitty (1941), Mireya Hernández (1942–2006), Raúl Leis (1947–2010), and Giovanna Benedetti (1949).

And the most recent writers: Manuel Orestes Nieto (1951), Moisés Pascual (1955), Consuelo Tomás (1957), Yolanda Hackshaw (1958), Allen Patiño (1959), Ariel Barría Alvarado (1959), Héctor Collado (1960), Gonzalo Menéndez González (1960), David Robinson Orobio (1960), Erika Harris (1963), Rogelio Guerra Ávila (1963), Carlos Fong (1967), Alexander Zanches (1968), Katia Chiari (1969), Porfirio Salazar (1970), Aura Sibila Benjamin (1970), Javier Stanziola (1971), Carlos Oriel Wynter Melo (1971), José Luis Rodríguez Pittí (1971), Eyra Harbar Gomez (1972), Melanie Taylor (1972), Salvador Medina Barahona (1973), Roberto Pérez-Franco (1976), Gloria Melania Rodríguez (1981), and Javier Alvarado (1982).

== Music ==
Present day Panamanian music has been influenced first by the Cuevas, Guna, Teribes, Ngöbe–Buglé and other indigenous populations, since the 16th century by the European musical traditions, especially those from the Iberian Peninsula, and then by the black population who were brought over, first as slaves from West Africa, between the 16th and 19th centuries, and then voluntarily (especially from Jamaica, Trinidad and Tobago, Barbados, Martinique, Guadeloupe, Trinidad, Saint Lucia) to work on the Panamanian Railroad and Canal projects between the 1840s and 1914. With this heritage, Panama has a rich and diverse music history, and important contributions to Cumbia, Saloma, Pasillo, Punto, Tamborito, Mejorana, Bolero, Jazz, Salsa, Reggae, Calypso, Rock and other musical genres. Not all people in Panama choose to listen to Spanish music. Some choose to listen to something they call "soca" music. So to summarize, Panamanians are considered mixed: American, Hispanic, and from the islands.

== The arts ==
=== Visual arts ===
Another example of Panama’s blended culture is reflected in the traditional products, such as woodcarvings, ceremonial masks and pottery, as well as in its architecture, cuisine, history and festivals. In earlier times, baskets were woven for utilitarian uses, but now many villages rely almost exclusively on the baskets they produce for the people.

The Guna people are known for molas, the elaborate embroidered panels that make up the front and back of a Guna woman's blouse. Originally the Guna word for blouse, the term mela now refers to the several layers of cloth varying in color that are loosely stitched closely together made using a reverse appliqué process.

The most renowned Panamanian painters are Hernando de la Cruz (1592–1646), Manuel Encarnacion Amador (1869–1952), Alberto Dutary (1928–1997), Etanislao Arias Peña (1952–2003), Adriano Herrerabarría, Roberto Lewis, Pablo Runyan and Rodolfo Antonio Méndez Vargas (1926–2004).

=== Panamanian Conte Bowl ===
Ancient Panamanian art has been lost throughout history; a few artifacts have been stored and saved from deterioration thanks to methods of burial or by being placed in ancient elite interments. Socio and cosmological Panamanian concepts can be learned by studying these types of ceramic pieces. This Pedestal Plate which is in Conte style is estimated to be from around A.D 600 to A.D. 800. This specific Bowl is held in a private collection and was photographed in 1991. Different interpretations can be made depending on what point of view the piece is studied. Mary W. Helms, an author on Panamanian history, studies the colors and shapes in the Conte Bowl to tell the story behind the beautiful artwork. This Conte Bowl consists of the colors black, dark red, and brown. In Helms' evaluation the color black represents a Panamanian serpent, to be more exact a boa constrictor. The Panamanian serpent can be traced back to cosmic or mythological Mayan version of rainbow serpent, commonly known in indigenous mythology. The rainbow serpent to many ancient people connects the rainbow and snake, demonstrating how important it is for life to have water. The red portion of the bowl is representing mammals; small appendages can be seen, representing the presence of life. The red and black work together to show ingenious appreciation of the mystical and the living. The brown in this piece makes its way around the appendages, glorifying the female anatomy. Museums all around North America possess many such artifacts; they encode different stories and meanings.

=== Nuchukana of the Guna ===
The Guna people are native to the land which is now known as Panama and Guatemala. These people often have sacred rituals or traditions, one of them being the Nuchukana. Paolo Fortis writes about Nuchukanas in his 2012 book "Kuna Art and Shamanism : An Ethnographic Approach". Nuchukana are carved wooden human-like figures. They are used to cure people from illness or to bring back the dead. Although they are a mythological practice; these wooden figures hold a sentimental and cultural value that the Guna people hold near to their hearts. When a person is in need a proper ritual is done involving chanting and tobacco smoking. The Nuchukana are asked to search for the cause of a person's illness. When the Nuchukana are not being used they are kept in a bundle in the house. The Guna believe that evil spirits will be kept out of the home. For this same reason the Nuchukana figures are respected and sometimes even shown to visitors and friends. Each Nuchukana holds a story or a tale of why it was created and why it is so special. Elder Guna respect the Nuchukana and treat them as part of the family. It is important for the Guna to keep Nuchukana sacred—only young girls or elderly grandmothers may wash and clean Nuchukanas. It is possible for some Guna to prefer a specific Nuchukana, making a special personal connection between a human and a wooden figure. Nuchukanas are so valuable that they are inherited from generation to generation. Once a Nuchukana wooden figure has deteriorated, it is simply tossed away, sometimes accompanied with a chant. Today, these Nuchukanas can be found in the rural homes of the Guna people, or in local museums that were able to take care of these objects.

== Museums ==
The best overview of Panamanian culture is found in the Museum of the Panamanian, in Panama City. Other views can be found at the Museum of Panamanian History, the Museum of Natural Sciences, the Museum of Religious Colonial Art, the Museum of Contemporary Art, the Museum of the Interoceanic Canal, and the national institutes of culture and music.

A number of museums located in smaller communities throughout Panama's interior strive to preserve numerous aspects of the country's pre-Columbian, colonial and post-independence heritage. Examples include the Museum of Nationality in Los Santos, located in an original colonial home and exhibiting relics from the region’s pre-Columbian inhabitants, colonial period and nascent struggle for independence from Spain. The Herrera Museum was ranked #2 of six things to do in Chitre by Lonely Planet travelers. The two-story museum includes permanent exhibits covering the pre-Hispanic period, the region’s first mammals, and the contact between the Spanish and the natives. The main highlight of the second floor is a carefully constructed replica of the burial site of the Indian chief (Cacique) Parita.

An additional museum will soon be opening in Chitre as part of a unique tourism/residential project currently being developed. The Cubitá Museum will explore the variety of cultural influences that have shaped the history, art and folklore of the Azuero Peninsula, and to appreciate the unique and painstakingly crafted work of local artisans.

A scholarly analysis of Panamanian Museums, their history, exhibitions and social, political and economic contexts is available in the 2011 book "Panamanian Museums and Historical Memory".

== See also ==
- Public holidays in Panama
- Pollera, national dress
- Señorita Panamá
