= Panamanian literature =

Panamanian literature comprises the whole of literary works written in Panama. The first literature relating to Panama can be dated to 1535, with a modern literary movement appearing from the mid-19th century onwards

== Early literature ==
Panamanian historian and essayist Rodrigo Miró (1912-1996) cites Gonzalo Fernández de Oviedo y Valdés as being the author of the first Panamanian literary work, the story of a character named Andrea de la Roca, which was published as part of the "Historia General y Natural de Las Indias" (1535).

The first literature from Panamanian born authors comes from the 17th century with the title of "Llanto de Panamá a la muerte de don Enrique Enríquez" (Crying from Panama at the Death of Don Enrique Enríquez). Although this anthology was formed during the Colony, most of the poems in it were written by authors born in Panama.

A modern literary movement appeared in Panama from the mid-19th century onwards.

== Poetry ==
=== During the Colony ===
Rodrigo Miró in his "Itinerario de la Poesía en Panamá" (Poetry Itinerary in Panama) talks about various Spanish authors: Mateo Rosas de Oquendo, author of an autobiographic romance; Juan de Miramontes y Zuázola, author of "Armas Antárticas" (Antarctic Weapons); Juan de Páramo y Cepeda, author of "Alteraciones del Dariel" (Dariel Alterations); and others. Also, in this period arose the author of "La Política del Mundo" (World Politics), Víctor de la Guardia y Ayala. "La Política del Mundo" is a "stage play" that was performed for the first time in 1809. The importance of Víctor de la Guardia y Ayala is that he was born in Panama, contrary to others that came from Spain and, for this reason, for a while he was considered the "first Panamanian poet".

However, the discovery of some manuscripts which come from the 17th century caused the revision of this idea, because the first reference from this period which indicates a written production by Panamanian authors (in other words, born in Panama) dates from 1638 and it is an anthology called "Llanto de Panamá a la muerte de don Enrique Enríquez" (Crying from Panama at the Death of Don Enrique Enríquez). This anthology groups works written for the death of Enrique Enríquez, governor of Panama. It was edited for the first time in Madrid (1642) and its author was Mateo Ribera (Panamanian); also he wrote many poems in this work. Although most of "Llanto de Panamá"´s poems were written by Panamanians, it has many works written by Spanish authors.

This discovery was accomplished by the Spanish diplomat Antonio Serrano de Haro, who also studied these manuscripts. A new version of this anthology was published at 1984 in a combined job between the Universidad de Panamá and the "Instituto de Cultura Hispánica". This discovery confirms, in fact, that the first Panamanian literary manifestations (found until now) come from the 17th century.

=== Romanticism ===
Panama was not isolated from revolutionary movements which were seeking the independence of colonies from Spain. The drive for independence was accomplished with the Independence of Panama from Spain on November 28, 1821. As in other colonies, Panamanian Romanticism was related to, and influenced by, libertarian and nationalist notions. Much of the literature of the period was produced by amateur authors; professional authors remained few.

Among the first romantic Panamanian poets were Manuel María Ayala (1785–1824) and Tomás Miró Rubini (1800–1881), followed by José María Alemán (1830–1887), Gil Colunje (1831–1899), Tomás Martín Feuillet (1832–1899), José Dolores Urriola (1834–1883), Amelia Denis de Icaza (1836–1911), Manuel José Pérez (1837–1895), Jeronimo de la Ossa (1847–1907), Federico Escobar (1861–1912) and Rodolfo Caicedo (1868–1905).

Romantic poetry, tinged with notions of nationalism, would be the main theme in Panamanian poetic works until the mid-20th century when avant-garde poetry arrived in Panama.

=== Modernism ===
In 1903, Panama separated from Colombia; this time saw the peak of modernism in Hispanic literature. The first modernist was Darío Herrera (1870–1914), friend and follower of Rubén Darío, whom he met in Buenos Aires. Another important poet was León Antonio Soto (1874–1902), who died at a young age when tortured by the police for having championed the cause of Panama.

Two literary magazines focused mainly on the dissemination of the modernist movement: El Heraldo del Istmo (1904–1906), directed by Guillermo Andreve (1879–1940), and Nuevos Ritos (1907), founded by Ricardo Miró (1883–1940). Ricardo Miró is perhaps the most prominent poet of Panamanian modernism. His poem "Patria" (1909) is also famous.

At this time, Gaspar Octavio Hernández (1893–1918), author of Melodías del pasado (1915) and La copa de amatista (1923), was also active. Other notable poets of the same generation were María Olimpia de Obaldía (1891–1985) and Demetrio Korsi (1899–1957).

=== 1930 to present ===
Since 1930, coinciding with the "Communal Action" (Acción Comunal) youth revolution, a new generation of poets, grouped around the magazine Antena, distanced itself from modernist rhetoric, instead approaching the avant-garde. The main reference for this transformation was Rogelio Sinán (Taboga, 1902 – Panamá, 1994), an author who had traveled in Europe and visited the surrealists in Paris. Onda (1929) shows the influence of pure poetry; other major works by Sinan include Incendios (1944) and Semana Santa en la niebla (1949), in which dreamlike elements show his surrealist affiliation.

Surrealism is also evident in the work of Ricardo J. Bermúdez (1914), whose most famous work is Laurel de cenizas (1951). The work of Demetrio Herrera Sevillano (1902–1950) is also a part of this avant-garde movement; his work was greatly influenced by ultraísmo.

Another poet of this era, who was also a short-story writer and journalist, was Mario Augusto Rodríguez (1917). In 1957, he published his poetry collection Canto de amor para la Patría novia, a poetic history of the Panamanian nation.

Other major poets of this era include Stella Sierra, Roque Javier Laurenza, Ofelia Hooper, Tobías Díaz Blaitry (1919–2006), Tristán Solarte (1934), José de Jesús Martínez, Diana Morán (1932), Alvaro Menéndez Franco (1932), Luis Carlos Jiménez Varela, José Guillermo Ross-Zanet (1930), José Franco (1931), and Elsie Alvarado de Ricord (1928–2005).

Major poets of the next generation included Benjamín Ramón (1939), Bertalicia Peralta (1939), Ramón Oviero (1939–2008), Moravia Ochoa López (1941), Dimas Lidio Pitty (1941-2015), Roberto Fernández Iglesias (1941), Eric Arce (1942), Enrique Jaramillo Levi (1944), Jarl Ricardo Babot (1945), Giovanna Benedetti (1950), Manuel Orestes Nieto (1951), Moisés Pascual (1955), Consuelo Tomás (1957), Leoncio Obando (b. Lidice, 1959 - d. La Chorrera, 2023), Héctor M. Collado (1960), and Pablo Menacho (1960).

At the end of the 20th century emerged a new generation of poets, who began to publish after 1990. Major poets of this era include Javier Romero Hernández (Chorrera, 1983), Sofía Santim (Panamá, 1982), Javier Alvarado (Santiago de Veraguas, 1982), Salvador Medina Barahona (Mariabé de Pedasí, 1973), Eyra Harbar Gomez (Bocas del Toro, 1972), Ela Urriola (Panama, 1971), Aura Benjamín (Panamá, 1970), Porfirio Salazar (1970), Katia Chiari (Panamá, 1969), and Alexander Zanches (David, Chiriquí, 1968).

== Narrative ==
=== Modernism and the first Panamanian books ===
The short story in Panama can be said to have begun formally in 1903, when Darío Herrera (1870–1914) published the first book of stories by a Panamanian author, Horas Lejanas, in Buenos Aires, Argentina. Since this time, the short story has been the most important literary genre in Panama.

Nearly all modernist and postmodernist poets in Panama published stories during the late 19th and early 20th centuries. Of these, Salomón Ponce Aguilera (1868–1945), Guillermo Andreve, Gaspar Octavio Hernández (1883–1940), and Ricardo Miró (1883–1940) stand out as poets whose short stories, often scattered and unpublished, were picked up and commented on by writer Mario Augusto Rodríguez in 1956. Other important authors of this period include José María Núñez (1894–1990), Moisés Castillo (1899–1974), and Gil Blas Tejeira (1901–1975).

=== Themes of the countryside and the canal in narrative ===
One notable author of the next generation was Rogelio Sinán (1902-1994), author of the novel Plenilunio and the collections of stories A la orilla de las estatuas maduras (1946), La boina roja y cinco cuentos (1954), Cuentos de Rogelio Sinán (1971), and El candelabro de los malos ofidios (1982). Other authors of this generation included Lucas Bárcenas (1906–1992), César Candanedo (1906–1993), Renato Ozores (1910–2001), Alfredo Cantón (1910-1967), Ricardo Bermúdez (1914–2000), Mario Augusto Rodríguez (1917–2009) (author of Campo Adentro (1947), Luna en Veraguas (1948), and Los ultrajados (1994)), José María Sánchez (1918–1973), Ramón H. Jurado (1922–1978), Joaquín Beleño (1921–1988), Carlos Francisco Changmarín (1922–2012), Jorge Turner (1922–2011), Tristán Solarte (1924–2019) and José Guillermo Ros-Zanet (1930). In this generation, authors cultivated nationalistic themes, either from the point of view of the cities at each end of the Panama Canal and their relation to the Canal Zone, or from rural point of view from the interior of the country.

=== Universal themes ===
The next generation is that of authors born since 1932. Many of these authors are still producing literary works. Major authors of this generation include Ernesto Endara (1932), Álvaro Menéndez Franco (1932), Enrique Chuez (1934), Justo Arroyo (1936), Rosa María Britton (1936), Victoria Jiménez Vélez (1937), Pedro Rivera (1939), Benajamín Ramón (1939), Beatríz Valdés (1940), Gloria Guardia (1940), Dimas Lidio Pitty (1941), Moravia Ochoa López (1941), Mireya Hernández (1942–2006), Enrique Jaramillo Levi (1944), Isabel Herrera de Taylor (1944), Raúl Leis (1947), Giovanna Benedetti (1949), Lupita Quirós Athanasiadis (1950), Rey Barría (1951), Ramón Fonseca Mora (1952), Herastro Reyes (1952–2005), Claudio de Castro (1957), Consuelo Tomás (1957), Yolanda Hackshaw (1958), Allen Patiño (1959), Rafael Alexis Álvarez (1959), Ariel Barría Alvarado (1959), Héctor Collado (1960), Gonzalo Menéndez González (1960), David Robinson Orobio (1960), Erika Harris (1963), and Rogelio Guerra Ávila (1963). This generation is notable for its abandonment of criollismo as a narrative theme in favor of universal themes, and in some cases, emphasizing dream and fantasy.

=== Twenty-first century narrative ===
Publishing for the first time in the 1990s, the newest generation of Panamanian storytellers has emerged. Among these writers are Carlos Fong (1967), Carlos Oriel Wynter Melo (1971), Javier Stanziola (1971), José Luis Rodríguez Pittí (1971), Melanie Taylor (1972), Lili Mendoza (1974), Lilian Guevara (1974), Roberto Pérez-Franco (1976), Gloria Melania Rodríguez (1981), and Annabel Miguelena (1984). This generation is characterized by the use of short fiction, poetic and imaginative language, and human themes, in which the individual stands out above a chaotic, typically urban environment.
