= List of Panamanians =

República de Panamá

This is a list of Panamanian people who are famous or notable and were either born in Panama or have Panamanian ancestry.

== Beauty queens and fashion models ==
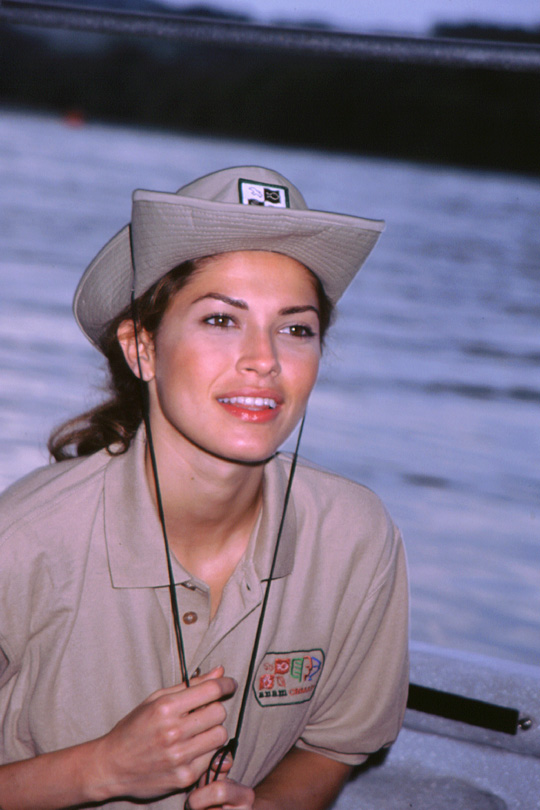
Justine Pasek

- Ester Cordet, former Playboy Playmate of the Month
- Gloria Karamañites, first Afro-Panamanian winner of Miss Panama
- Patricia de León, former Señorita Panamá, actress, LGBT activist
- Justine Pasek, former Miss Universe
- Ana Orillac, former Señorita Panamá
- Stefanie de Roux, TV host and former Señorita Panamá
- Rachel Smith, former Miss USA

== Business ==
- Ursula M. Burns, CEO of Xerox
- Pedro Heilbron, CEO of Copa Airlines
- Karl Kani, urban fashion designer (Panamanian father)
- Julio Mario Santo Domingo, Colombian-American businessman, diplomat (born in Panama)
- Fernando Wong, landscape designer
- Carlos de la Ossa, Public Official

== Entertainment ==
- Sharon Aguilar, musician/composer
- Akinyele, rapper (Panamanian mother)
- Tatyana Ali, actress, calypso singer, and composer (Panamanian mother)
- Nancy Ames, singer
- Tyson Beckford, model (maternal grandmother born in Panama)
- Aloe Blacc, singer
- Pop Smoke, rapper (Panamanian father)
- Rubén Blades, singer, actor, former Minister of Tourism
- Miguel Bosé, Spanish actor and singer (born in Panama)
- Jordana Brewster, actress
- Casanova, rapper
- Billy Cobham, drummer for Mahavishnu Orchestra
- Silvia de Grasse, jazz and tamborera singer
- Melissa De Sousa, American actress (Panamanian heritage)
- Edgardo Diaz, music producer (Menudo) (born in Panama)
- Erika Ender, musician/composer
- La Factoría, Spanish reggae duo
- Flex, Spanish reggae artist
- Gaitanes, singers, musical producers, composers
- Carlos Garnett, jazz saxophonist
- El General, Spanish reggae artist
- Margarita Henríquez, singer
- Lori Heuring, actress
- Clark Kent, rap music producer
- Vincent Laresca, actor
- Gladys de la Lastra, drummer, composer, and musician
- Ravyn Lenae, singer
- Eddy Lover, Spanish reggae artist
- Makano, Spanish reggae artist
- Jaime Murrell, singer
- Uncle Murda, rapper
- Nando Boom, reggae artist
- Danilo Pérez, jazz pianist, producer, composer
- José Quintero, Broadway director
- Los Rabanes, reggae-rock band
- J. August Richards, actor
- Coco Rodriguez, singer, actress
- José Luis Rodríguez Vélez, orchestra director, clarinetist, composer
- Daphne Rubin-Vega, actress and singer
- Samy y Sandra Sandoval, singer, musician
- Sech, singer-songwriter, rapper, and producer
- DJ Spinna, record producer and DJ (Panamanian roots)
- Santiago Stevenson, singer, composer, ordained minister
- Alexis Texas, American adult film actress
- Tessa Thompson, actress and singer (Panamanian father)
- Ingrid de Ycaza, singer
- Aaron Zebede, actor, director and producer

== Historical figures ==
- Bayano, rebel slave
- Floyd Britton, political dissident
- Edward Ashton Gaskin Stuart, educator and labor leader
- Victoriano Lorenzo, politician and national hero
- Marta Matamoros, trade unionist
- Juan Materno Vásquez de León, lawyer and professor
- Luis Anderson McNeil, former labor minister
- Jerónimo de la Ossa, poet, wrote national anthem
- Belisario Porras, former president
- Urracá, chieftain

== Journalism ==
- Escolastico Calvo, journalist
- Gwen Ifill, television correspondent and host
- Gustavo Adolfo Mellander, academic journalist
- Juan Williams, television correspondent

== Literature ==
- Rosa María Britton, writer
- Carlos Fuentes, Mexican writer (born in Panama)
- Gloria Guardia, novelist and essayist
- Demetrio Korsi, poet, author of Incidente de Cumbia, diplomat and journalist
- Ricardo Miró, poet
- Rogelio Sinán, poet and writer
- José Luis Rodríguez Pittí, writer and photographer
- Consuelo Tomás, writer
- Neil Raymond Ricco, Spanish-Italian American poet and writer (born in Panama)

== Politics ==
- Arsenio Dominguez, secretary general of the International Maritime Organization
- Arnulfo Arias Madrid, former president
- Harmodio Arias Madrid, former president
- Nicolás Ardito Barletta, former president
- Antonio Dominguez Richa, diplomat and politician
- Guillermo Endara, former president
- Adrian Fenty, former mayor of Washington, D.C. (Panamanian father)
- Esteban Huertas, independence fighter
- Jorge Illueca, diplomat and politician
- Julio E. Linares, former Treasury Minister (1963–1964) and Foreign Minister (1989–1993)
- Ricardo Martinelli, former president
- John McCain, United States politician (born in Panama)
- Mireya Moscoso, former president
- Norberto Navarro, Minister of Public Works under three presidents, 1940s-50s. Founded the PRI party.
- Manuel Antonio Noriega, former dictator
- Carlos Ozores, former first vice president
- Ana Paredes Arosemena, former First Lady of Ecuador
- Rubén Darío Paredes del Río, former military ruler
- Ernesto Pérez Balladares, former president
- Belisario Porras, former president
- José Antonio Price, physician and politician
- Emilio Sempris, former Minister of Environment
- Dudley Thompson (Jamaican politician), Jamaican Pan-Africanist, politician and diplomat
- Martín Torrijos Espino, former president
- Omar Torrijos, former dictator
- Franklin U. Valderrama, United States district judge (born in Panama)
- Juan Carlos Varela, former president

== Scientists and academics ==
- Reina Torres de Araúz, anthropologist, ethnographer, professor

== Sports ==
=== Baseball ===
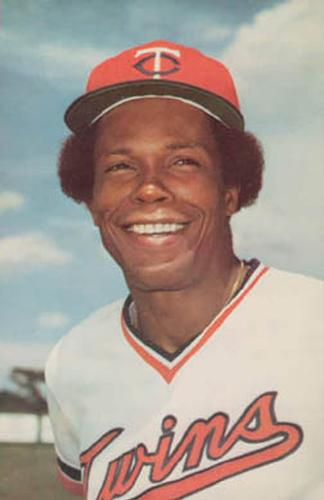
Rod Carew

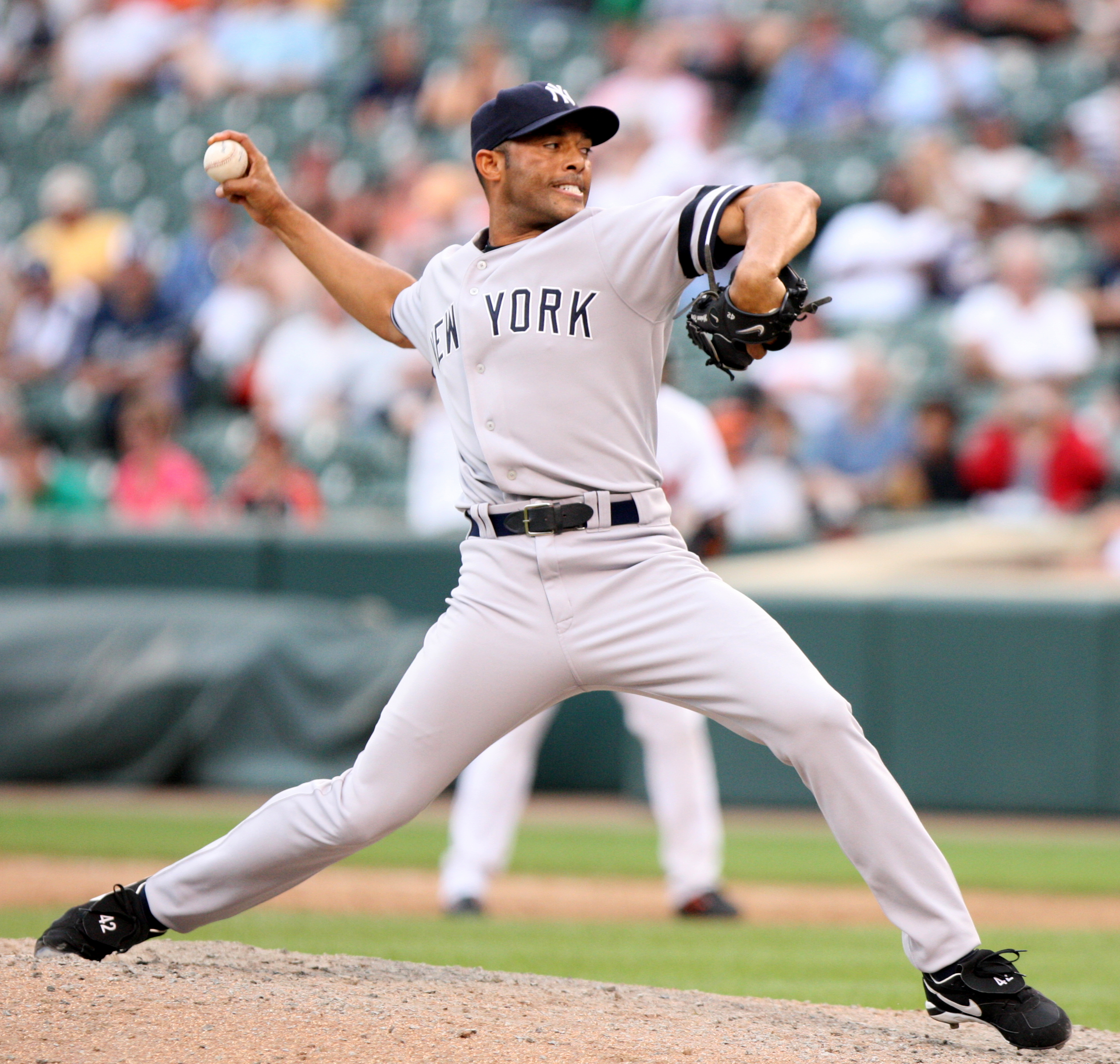
Mariano Rivera

- Juan Berenguer, professional baseball player
- Johan Camargo, professional baseball player
- Rod Carew, professional baseball player
- Bruce Chen, professional baseball player
- Manuel Corpas, professional baseball player
- Einar Díaz, professional baseball player
- Roberto Kelly, baseball player
- Carlos Lee, professional baseball player
- Héctor López, professional baseball player
- José Macías, professional baseball player
- Ramiro Mendoza, professional baseball player
- Orlando Miller, professional baseball player
- Ramiro Mendoza, professional baseball player
- Orlando Miller, professional baseball player
- Ben Oglivie, professional baseball player
- Mariano Rivera, professional baseball player
- Rubén Rivera, professional baseball player
- Humberto Robinson, major league baseball player
- Davis Romero, professional baseball player
- Carlos Ruiz, professional baseball player
- Olmedo Sáenz, professional baseball player
- Manny Sanguillén, professional baseball player
- Rennie Stennett, professional baseball player
- Ruben Tejada, professional baseball player

=== Basketball ===
- William Bedford, former basketball player
- Rolando Blackman, former basketball player
- Lorenzo Charles, professional basketball player (Panamanian parents)
- Ed Cota, basketball player
- Kevin Daley, basketball player and Harlem Globetrotter
- Gary Forbes, professional basketball player
- Rubén Garcés, former basketball player
- Stuart Gray, professional basketball player
- Leroy Jackson, professional basketball player
- Ricky Lindo (born 2000), American-Panamanian basketball player in the Israeli Basketball Premier League
- Donovan Mitchell, professional basketball player

=== Boxing ===
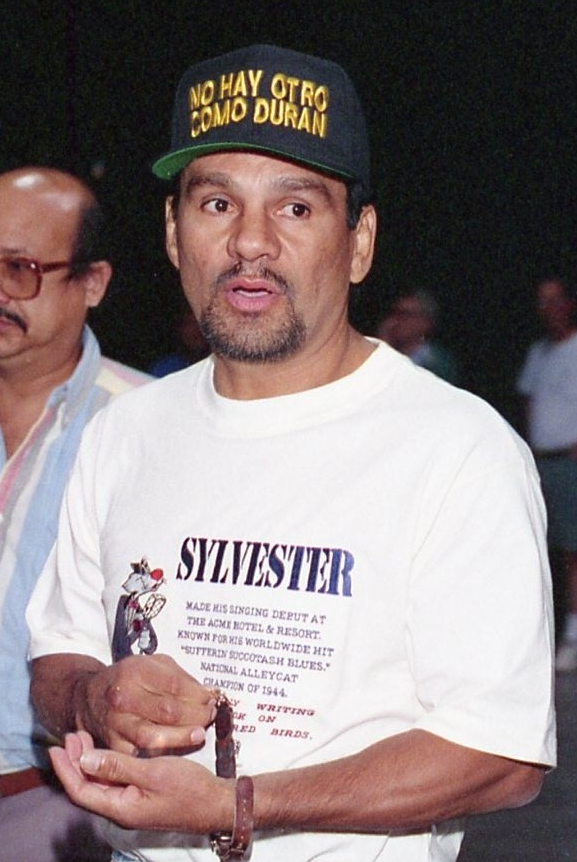
Roberto Durán

- Miguel Iriarte, world boxing champion
- Panama Al Brown, world boxing champion, first Hispanic world champion in history
- Roberto Durán, world boxing champion
- Alfonso Frazer, world champion boxer
- Guillermo Jones, professional boxer
- Jorge Luján, boxer
- Ernesto Marcel, professional boxer
- Eusebio Pedroza, former world boxing champion
- Hilario Zapata, professional boxer

=== Football (American) ===
- Leonardo Barker, professional American football player
- Frank Davis, professional football player
- Darius Holland, professional American football player
- Roberto Wallace, professional football player
- Fred Warner, professional football player

=== Soccer ===
- Edwin Aguilar, soccer player
- Michael Amir Murillo, soccer player
- Andrés Andrade Cedeño, soccer player
- Felipe Baloy, soccer player
- Édgar Bárce, soccer player
- Yoel Bárcenas, soccer player
- Adalberto Carrasquilla, soccer player
- Roberto Corbin, soccer player
- Harold Cummings, soccer player
- Jorge Dely Valdés, soccer player
- Gabriel Enrique Gómez, soccer player
- Luis Ernesto Tapia, soccer player
- Rommel Fernández, soccer player
- Aníbal Godoy, soccer player
- Carlos Harvey, soccer player
- Kevin Kurányi, German soccer player
- Roberto Nurse, soccer player
- Jaime Penedo, soccer player
- Blas Pérez, soccer player
- Luis Antonio Rivera, soccer player
- Arturo Tejada, soccer player
- Luis Tejada, soccer player
- Román Torres, soccer player

=== Track & field ===
- Reginald Beckford, sprinter
- Bayano Kamani, track and field athlete
- Lloyd La Beach, sprinter, first Olympic medal winner from Panama
- Irving Saladino, former World and Olympic track and field champion

=== Others ===
- Eileen Coparropa, Olympic swimmer
- George Headley, cricket player
- Bobby Lashley, professional wrestler and former mixed martial arts fighter
- Scott A. Muller, Olympic kayaker
- Laffit Pincay, Jr., horse jockey
- Oscar Willis Layne, cyclist

== Other ==
- Princess Angela of Liechtenstein, member of the Royal House of Liechtenstein
- Jorge Cham, webcomic producer, author and cartoonist of PhD comics
- Odette Cortez, choreographer, dancer and folklorist
