= List of Panamanian women writers =

This is a list of women writers who were born in Panama or whose writings are closely associated with that country.

== A ==
- Elsie Alvarado de Ricord (1928–2005), poet, essayist, biographer, linguist
- Patricia Alvarado Nuñez (born 1967), Panamanian-American television presenter, documentary screenwriter, photographer, journalist

== B ==
- Rosa María Britton (1936–2019), novelist, playwright

== D ==
- Amelia Denis de Icaza (1836–1911), romantic poet, the first Panamanian woman to publish her poetry
- Zoraida Díaz (1881–1948), Modernist poet; the first Panamanian woman to publish a book of her poetry

== G ==
- Nicole Garay (1873–1928), poet
- Aida González (born 1962), short story writer, medical doctor
- Gloria Guardia (1940–2019), novelist, essayist, short story writer, critic, journalist

== H ==
- Ofelia Hooper (1900–1981), sociologist, poet, non-fiction writer, civil rights activist

== L ==
- Olga F. Linares (1936–2014), Panamanian-American anthropologist, non-fiction writer

== M ==
- Annabel Miguelena (born 1984), novelist, short story writer, actress

== O ==
- María Olimpia de Obaldía (1891–1985), poet

== R ==
- Susana Richa de Torrijos (born 1924), educator, essayist, politician

== S ==
- Stella Sierra (1917–1997), poet, educator

== T ==
- Consuelo Tomás (born 1957), puppeteer, playwright, poet, novelist
- Reina Torres de Araúz (1932–1982), anthropologist, ethnographer, and professor

== See also ==
- List of women writers
- List of Spanish-language authors
