= Santiago Normal School =

The Escuela Normal Juan Demóstenes Arosemena, founded as Escuela Normal de Santiago, is a complete secondary school in the city of Santiago, Province of Veraguas in Panama. It began operations on June 5, 1938 for the training of elementary school teachers, established in the interior of the Republic.

It was named in honor of the memory of Juan Demóstenes Arosemena, President of the Republic, who died in office on December 16, 1939. The Santiago Normal School was declared a national historical monument by Law 54 of December 12, 1984.

Its current director is Professor Dora Bernal de Hernández.

== Structure ==
Its contours bring to life the Spanish colonial era. In 1988 the buildings occupied a total area of 42,500 m^{2} including the dormitories, the teaching building, the gardens and its courtyards. The front of the school is guarded by two carved lions by Luis Caselli. The vestibule has four eagles carved on the upper part.

In the front part of the school there is a statue in honor of Urracá (Ubarragá Maná Tigrí), a historical character from Veragüense and symbol of the struggle of the native peoples of Panama against the Spanish colonization.

The Juan Demóstenes Arosemena Normal School has a chapel and a priest. The library is named after Carlos Francisco Changmarín, in honor of the teacher, poet and writer from Veragüense.
