= José María Sánchez =

José María Sánchez may refer to:

- José María Sánchez Borbón (1918–1973), Panamanian writer
- José María Sánchez Carrión (born 1952), Spanish linguist
- José María Sánchez Lage (1931–2004), Argentine footballer
- José María Sánchez (Chilean footballer) (born 1985), Chilean footballer
- José María Sánchez Martínez (born 1983), Spanish referee
- José María Sánchez-Silva (1911–2002), Spanish children's writer
- José María Sánchez-Verdú (born 1968), Spanish composer
