= Darío Herrera =

Darío Herrera may refer to:

- Darío Herrera (poet), Panamanian poet and diplomat
- Darío Herrera (referee), Argentine football referee
- Dario Herrera (politician), American politician from Nevada
