= José Luis Rodríguez Pittí =

Panamanian writer and photographer

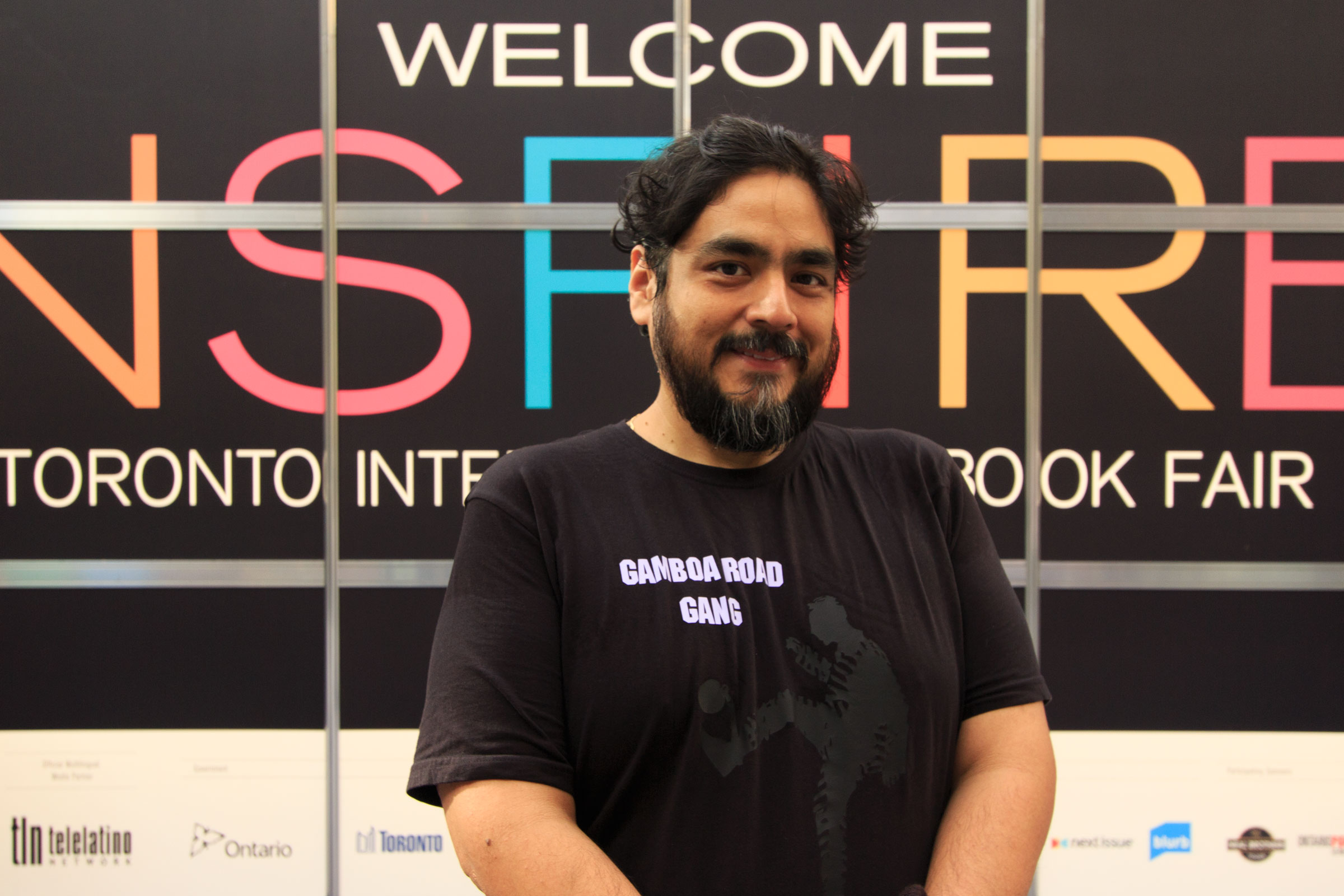
- José Luis Rodríguez Pittí at Inspire! Toronto International Book Fair 2014.
- Born: 29 March 1971 (age 55); Panama City, Panama
- Occupations: Writer, photographer, professor
- Relatives: Jose Luis Rodriguez Velez (composer), Mario Augusto Rodríguez (writer)
- Writing career
- Genres: Fiction, Essays, Short stories, poetry, Documentary photography
- Website: rodriguezpitti.com

José Luis Rodríguez Pittí is a Panamanian contemporary writer, video artist and documentary photographer.

He is the author of short stories, poems and essays. Rodríguez Pittí is author of the books Panamá Blues (2010, miniTEXTOS (2008), Sueños urbanos (2008) and Crónica de invisibles (1999). Most of his stories and essays were published in literary magazines and newspapers.

In 1994, the Universidad de Panamá awarded him with the Premio "Darío Herrera". Other literary honors received are Accesit in the Premio Nacional "Signos" 1993 (Panamá), Concurso Nacional de Cuentos "José María Sánchez" 1998 (Panamá), Concurso "Amadís de Gaula" 1999 (Soria, España) and the Concurso "Maga" de Cuento Corto 2001 (Panamá).

== Early life and education ==
Rodríguez Pittí was born in Panama City on 29 March 1971. He grew up in Mexico City, Santiago de Veraguas and Panamá City. He is resident of Toronto, Canada.

Graduated from the Universidad Tecnológica de Panamá, was Computer Vision, Programming Languages and Deep Learning Professor at the Universidad Tecnológica de Panamá and Universidad Santa María la Antigua.

== Biography ==
President of the Writers Association of Panama from 2008 to 2010. Founder and President of Fundación El Hacedor (since 2007).

From 1990 to 1995 he traveled extensively in the Panamanian region of Azuero to collect stories and photograph, the body of three photo essays: "Viernes Santo en Pesé", "Cuadernos de Azuero", and "Noche de carnaval". Other photography essays are "De diablos, diablicos y otros seres de la mitología panameña" and "Regee Child". Some of his photographs are cover art of books published in Panamá. His work has been exhibited in Panamá, México, Canadá and Italy.

== Awards and honors ==
- 1993, Finalista, Premio "Signos" de Joven Literatura 1993 otorgado en Panamá
- 1994, Premio "Darío Herrera" de Literatura otorgado por la Universidad de Panamá
- 1994, Premio Canon "Día de la Tierra"
- 1998, Accésit, Premio Nacional de Cuento "José María Sánchez" 1998 otorgado en Panamá
- 1999, Accésit, Concurso de Cuento "Amadis de Gaula" otorgado en Soria (España)

== Works ==
=== Fiction ===
- Crónica de invisibles (1999) ISBN 978-9962-802-06-8
- Sueños urbanos (2008, 2010) ISBN 978-9962-683-02-5

=== Photobooks ===
- Reggae Child (2010)
- De diablos, diablicos y otros seres de la mitología panameña (2010)
- Panamá Blues (2010)
- El camino de la cruz (2010)
- Cuadernos de Azuero (2010)

=== Machine learning ===
- Fundamentos de Redes Neuronales (1994, 2010) - Introduction to Artificial Neural Networks
- Visión de Máquina (1994, 2010) - Computer Vision

=== Anthologies ===
- Hasta el sol de mañana (Ed. E. Jaramillo Levi). Fundación Signos, Panamá, 1998. ISBN 996260401X
- Panamá cuenta (Ed. E. Jaramillo Levi). Editorial Norma, Panamá, 2003. ISBN 9968152250
- La minificción en Panamá (Ed. E. Jaramillo Levi). Universidad Pedagógica Nacional, Bogotá, Colombia, 2003. ISBN 978-958-8226-10-1
- Sueño compartido (Ed. E. Jaramillo Levi). Universal Books, Panamá, 2005. ISBN 9962623375
- Cuento que te quiero cuento (Ed. F. Morales de Castillo). 9Signos, Panamá, 2007. ISBN 978-9962-660-06-4
- miniTEXTOS (Ed. JL Rodríguez Pittí). Flash fiction anthology. El Hacedor, Panamá, 2010.
- Mundo 21 (Ed. Samaniego; Rodríguez; De Alarcón). Boston: Cengage Learning, 2010. ISBN 978-0-547-17131-9
- Con solo tu nombre y un poco de silencio (Poetry) (Ed. Héctor Collado). Panamá: Editorial Tecnológica, 2012. ISBN 978-9962-5534-4-1
- Tiempo al tiempo. Nuevos cuentistas de Panamá: 1990-2012. (Short-stories) (Ed. E. Jaramillo Levi). Panamá: Universal Books, 2012. ISBN 978-9962-5534-6-5
- Mensajes 12 (Antología literaria) (Ed. A. Barría Alvarado). Panamá: Editorial Santillana, 2012.
- MICROLAT. Antología de microficciones latinoamericanas (Editor: Sergio Gaut vel Hartman). México, D.F.: Universidad Autónoma de México, 2016.
- Aquí hay dragones (Ed. Alberto Sánchez Argüello). Managua, Nicaragua: Parafernalia Ediciones, 2016.
- Latinoamérica en breve (Ed. Sergio Gaut vel Hartman). México, D.F.: Universidad Autónoma Metropolitana Xochimilco, 2016. ISBN 978-607-28-0902-4
- Tierra breve. Antología centroamericana de minificción (Ed. Federico Hernández). San Salvador, El Salvador: Índole Editores, 2017. ISBN 978-9996130601
- Aquí hay dragones (Editor: Alberto Sánchez Argüello). Gainesville, FL, EEUU: La Pereza Ediciones, 2020. ISBN 978-1-62375-168-5
- Historias mínimas (Ed. Franz Gutierrez). Lima, Perú: Dendro Ediciones. 2020. ISBN 978-612-48322-2-2
- Minimundos (Ed. Eliana Soza Martínez y Karla Barajas). Lima, Perú: Dendro Editores, 2021.
- Latinoamérica cuenta (Ed. Renato Sandoval Bacigalupo). Bogotá, Colombia: Editorial Tragaluz, 2021. ISBN 978-958-53746-0-7
