= Frederick Warner =

Frederick or Fred Warner may refer to:

- Frederick Warner (diplomat) (1918–1995), British diplomat and politician
- Frederick Warner (engineer) (1910–2010), British chemical engineer
- Frederick Warner (politician) (1875–1952), Australian politician
- Fred M. Warner (1865–1923), Governor of the U.S. state of Michigan
- Fred Warner (baseball) (1855–1886), American baseball player
- Fred Warner (American football) (born 1996), American football player
- Fred L. Warner (1877–1942), politician in the Michigan House of Representatives
