= Adriano Herrerabarría =

Panamanian painter and teacher (1928–2022)

- Born: Adriano Herrerabarría; December 28, 1928; Santiago de Veraguas, Veraguas Province, Panama
- Died: August 13, 2022 (aged 93); Panama City, Panama
- Occupations: Painter and teacher

Adriano Herrerabarría (December 28, 1928 – August 13, 2022) was a Panamanian painter and teacher. He graduated as an elementary school teacher from the Escuela Normal de Santiago, but he devoted himself to learning the art of mural painting and, in 1955, obtained a master's degree in fine arts at the Academy of San Carlos de la Universidad Nacional Autonoma de Mexico and a degree in teaching art at the Ecole Normale Superieure de Mexico. Herrerabarría died in Panama City on August 13, 2022, at the age of 93.

== Paintings ==
=== Group exhibitions ===
- The Tlacuhilos Gallery - Mexico, DF (1955)
- The Biennale of America - Palacio de Bellas Artes - Mexico City (1958)
- XVI Biennial of São Paulo - Brazil (1979)
- Panama and Brazil meet. Atlapa - Panama (1982)

=== Individual exhibitions ===
- University of Panama - Panama (1959)
- Mariano Picon Salas Gallery - Caracas, Venezuela (1964)
- House of the Journalist - Panama (1966)
- Military Circle building - Caracas, Venezuela (1967)
- Caming House - London, UK (1971)
- Gallery of the Savings Bank - Panama (1973)
