= Fernando Wong =

Panamanian landscape designer

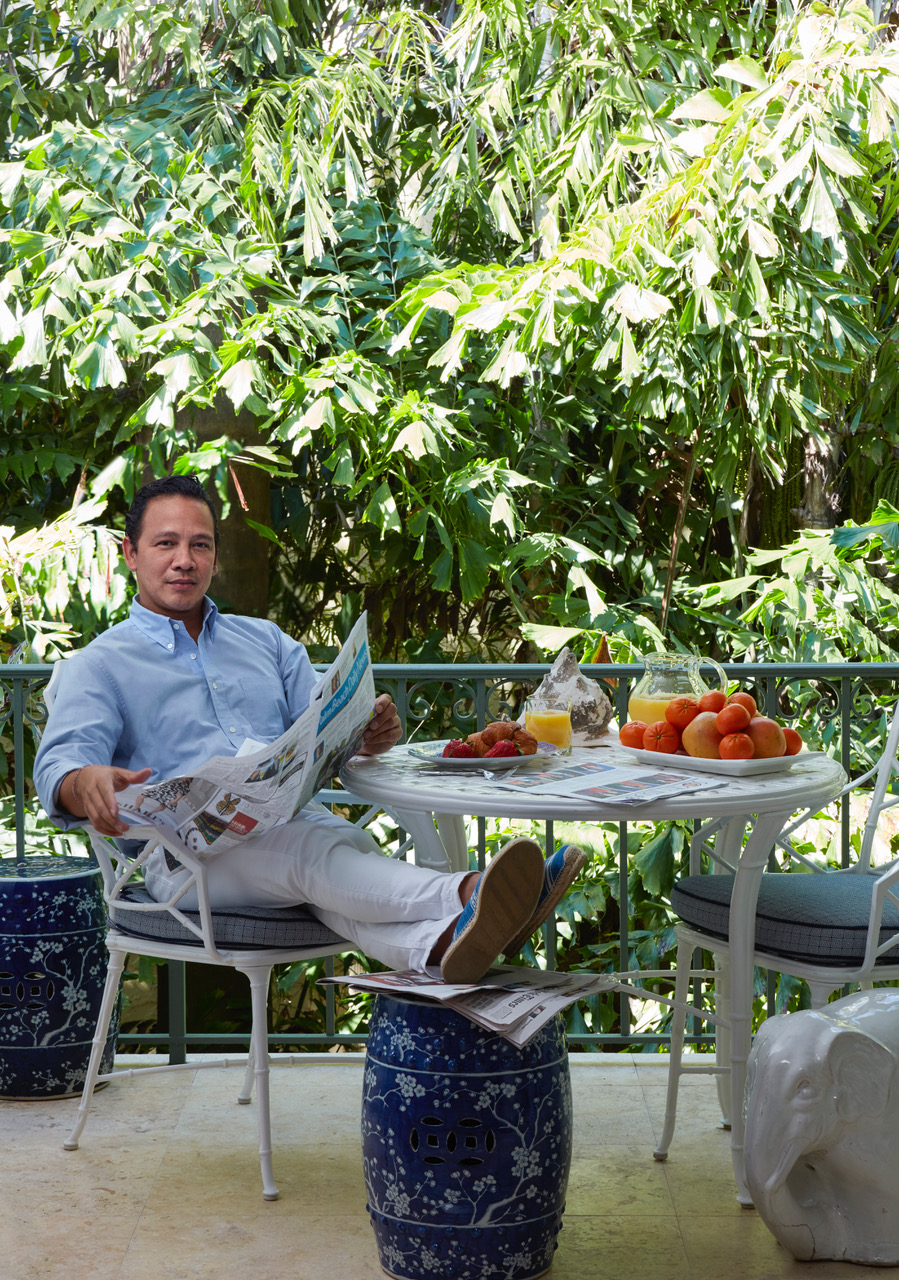
- Wong in 2019
- Born: Panama City, Panama
- Education: University of Panama
- Occupation: Landscape Designer
- Spouse: Timothy C. Johnson (m. 2019)
- Parent(s): Fernando Wong and Florinda Castillo-De Wong
- Website: www.fernandowongold.com

Fernando Wong is a Panamanian American landscape designer and the founder of Fernando Wong Outdoor Living Design, a firm he established in Miami Beach, Florida, in 2005 with his partner Tim Johnson. Based in South Florida, the firm designs private gardens, hotels, museums and public parks, and maintains offices in Miami Beach, Palm Beach, and Panama City, Panama. Wong's work includes the landscapes for three Four Seasons properties in South Florida, the sculpture garden at the Institute of Contemporary Art, Miami, and, in 2025, a garden at the RHS Chelsea Flower Show in London. He was one of the three judges on the Discovery+ topiary-competition series Clipped, alongside Martha Stewart.

== Early life ==
Fernando Wong was born in Panama City, the capital of Panama, and is the grandson of a Chinese immigrant. In his youth he was an athlete, competing as a swimmer and pentathlete, with competitions taking him to Chile and Mexico. He studied architecture and interior design at the University of Panama.

Wong moved to the United States in 2001. He taught himself to speak English by watching television and initially used photographs to help communicate his design ideas to clients. He found early work on a landscape crew — driving a truck, mixing cement and moving plants — and also produced freehand sketches and renderings for interior designers; when the owner of the landscape company saw his drawings, he moved Wong into the design office.

== Career ==
Wong founded Fernando Wong Outdoor Living Design in Miami Beach in 2005 with his partner Tim Johnson, beginning from a guest-bedroom office. As his client base grew in Palm Beach and elsewhere in South Florida, the firm opened a second office in Palm Beach. In 2025 the firm opened an office in Panama City, the capital of Panama and Wong's birthplace. Johnson serves as the firm's chief executive.

Wong's landscape for The Surf Club at the Four Seasons in Surfside, Florida, was created in collaboration with Pritzker Prize–winning architect Richard Meier, and interior designers Joseph Dirand and Lee Mindell; Wong installed thousands of palms, plants, and trees across 9 oceanfront acres A century-old banyan was divided into five pieces, moved to the hotel courtyard and reassembled on site. He went on to design the outdoor spaces at the Four Seasons Private Residences in Fort Lauderdale with architect Kobi Karp and interior designer Tara Bernerd. He also designed the Four Seasons Resort Palm Beach with interior designer Martin Brudnizki.

His other notable commissions include the 15,000-square-foot sculpture garden at the Institute of Contemporary Art, Miami — his first sculpture-garden project — and, in Savannah, Georgia, the landscape for the Perry Lane Hotel and for Hotel Bardo, the reinvention of the historic Mansion on Forsyth Park. In the Bahamas his work includes the grounds within the Lyford Cay Club in Nassau and the Retreat Garden national park, also in Nassau, for the Bahamian government. Wong restored the formal gardens of the landmarked 1938 John L. Volk–designed estate on Palm Beach's South Lake Trail, a project centered on a century-old kapok tree; the work received a Palladio Award. This estate set a lakefront sales record when it sold for $71.85 million in 2020. With architect Kiko Sánchez and designer David Netto, he designed the garden of a Bahamas residence overlooking a golf course that was published by Architectural Digest. He is also the landscape designer for Kaiya, the beach-resort community adjacent to Alys Beach on Florida's Gulf Coast. A garden Wong designed for Desmond and Ann Heathwood in Palm Beach, Florida, surrounding a 1936 Mediterranean Revival house by the architect John Volk, was documented in the Smithsonian Institution's Archives of American Gardens as "A Tropical Tapestry," submitted by the Garden Club of Palm Beach as part of The Garden Club of America collection. His reported clients include actor Matt Damon and golfer Greg Norman, and his international work includes resorts in Mexico, Colombia and Grenada. In 2026 Wong began work on restoring the historic gardens of the Hadwen House, an 1846 Greek Revival landmark owned by the Nantucket Historical Association, presenting his plans at the association's Nantucket by Design event in July 2026.

Because he trained in architecture, Wong applies classical architectural principles — scale, proportion, balance and a respect for the center axis — to his gardens, describing the landscape as "a supporting actor to the protagonist, which is the house," and summarizing his approach as "the architecture is the picture, and the landscape is the frame." He calls his tropical-yet-formal style a "civilized jungle" and structures most gardens on an "80/20 rule" of evergreen woody plants to seasonal color.

== International Exhibitions & Chelsea Flower Show ==
In 2023, for the 40th anniversary of Les Amis de Vaux-le-Vicomte and the château's campaign to restore André Le Nôtre's fountains and waterworks, Wong reimagined the famous vestibule of the Château de Vaux-le-Vicomte in France. His blue-and-white scheme drew on 18th-century European garden tents and the château's collection of Chinese porcelain, and incorporated Schumacher fabric and a David Harber sculpture. Designers Christian Louboutin and Peter Marino have also designed the same vestibule in other years. In 2024, Wong and the interior designer Ken Fulk were the only two US-based designers selected for the third edition of WOW!house at the Design Centre, Chelsea Harbour, in London. Wong designed an outdoor room, the Summit Terrace, in collaboration with Summit Furniture, describing it as "a lush oasis in the middle of a civilised jungle." He joined English designers Veere Greeney, Colefax & Fowler, and Alidad for one of the world’s most prestigious design events Wong also appeared on the event's talks programme in conversation with Tim Boyd of Michaelis Boyd, chaired by the editor-in-chief of ELLE Decoration.

For the 2025 RHS Chelsea Flower Show in London, Wong designed the trade-stand garden for the British sculptor David Harber, located on Main Avenue and built by Hardwood Landscapes. The design took the form of a labyrinth of pathways inspired by English parterre gardens, with clipped hedging and specimen trees framing hidden sculptures, and served as the setting for two new Harber works. The garden received a five-star rating from the Royal Horticultural Society.

== Television & Publications ==
In 2021 Wong was one of three judges — alongside Martha Stewart and Chris Lambton — on Clipped, a topiary-design competition series hosted by Michael Urie, in which seven contestants competed for a $50,000 prize. The six-part series premiered on Discovery+ on May 12, 2021, and later aired on HGTV. That same year, he was featured on NBC's Today Show. In 2024 he led Martha Stewart on a tour of favorite tropical gardens for the second season of her streaming series Martha Gardens. He later appeared on The Martha Stewart Podcast in 2025.

In 2024, The Young Man and the Tree: Fernando Wong Landscape Design, a book of Wong's work written by Tim Johnson, was published by Vendome Press, with a foreword by Martha Stewart.

In July 2025 Wong was the keynote speaker along with Martha Stewart at the Nantucket Historical Association's Nantucket by Design event. In September 2025 the design channel Homeworthy released a video tour of Wong's Miami garden project "Shangri La."

== Awards ==
Year	Award	Awarded by	Category
2011	The DCOTA Stars of Design Award	The Design Center of the Americas	Landscape Design
2018	The Lesly S Smith Award	Preservation Foundation of Palm Beach	Landscape Design
2018	Addison Mizner Award	The Institute of Classical Architecture and Art	Landscape Architecture
2018	RED Award - Regional	LUXE Interiors + Design	Landscape Design
2019	RED Award - Regional	LUXE Interiors + Design	Landscape Design / Outdoor Spaces
2020	RED Award - Regional	LUXE Interiors + Design	Landscape Design / Outdoor Rooms
2020	Addison Mizner Award	The Institute of Classical Architecture & Art	Landscape Architecture
2021	Palladio Award	Traditional Building	Exterior Spaces: Gardens & Landscapes
2021	RED Award - Regional	LUXE Interiors + Design	Landscape Design/Outdoor Rooms
2022	Addison Mizner Award	The Institute of Classical Architecture & Art	Landscape Architecture
2023	Addison Mizner Award	The Institute of Classical Architecture and Art	
2024	RED Award - Regional	LUXE Interiors + Design	Landscape Architecture
2024	RED Award - National	LUXE Interiors + Design	Landscape Architecture
2025	5 Star Tradestand Award at Chelsea Flower Show	Royal Horticultural Society	Landscape Design
2026	RED Award - Regional	LUXE Interiors + Design	Landscape Architecture
2026	RED Award - National	LUXE Interiors + Design	Landscape Architecture
2026	Richard M. Kleid Citizens of the Year	Citizens' Association of Palm Beach	Civic Honor (jointly with Tim Johnson)

== Civic & Professional Activities ==
In 2019 Wong served as design chair of the Chicago Antiques + Art + Design Show, together with interior designer Amanda Lindroth. In 2025 he served as a judge for the Luxe Interiors + Design RED Awards. He served as a member of the Town of Palm Beach Landmarks Preservation Commission for five years. In March 2025 Wong and Johnson gave a joint talk, "The Young Man and the Tree," at the Society of the Four Arts in Palm Beach, followed by a signing of their book. In October 2025 he joined Amanda Lindroth's Design Retreat Weekend at The Dunlin, Auberge Resorts Collection, near Charleston, South Carolina, taking part in a public design panel. He was also a featured speaker at Beacon Hill Design Day 2025 in Boston, presented by the Institute of Classical Architecture & Art's New England chapter. In January 2026 he joined the "Room Service: The Art of Hospitality Design" panel at Palm Beach Design Days, alongside Sarah Wetenhall, Rita Konig and Amanda Lindroth. Later that month Wong and Johnson delivered the Sunday lecture, "Nature's Canvas: The Art of Outdoor Living Spaces," at the Washington Winter Show. In April 2026, he spoke at the Palm Beach Society of the Four Arts as one of the "Legends of Landscape." In 2026 he and Johnson were also named among Southern Living magazine's inaugural "Groundbreakers," recognized for creating gardens with native plants and classical design principles. That same year, Wong and Johnson were jointly named the inaugural recipients of the Richard M. Kleid Citizen of the Year Award by the Citizens' Association of Palm Beach.
