= Justo Arroyo =

Panamanian writer

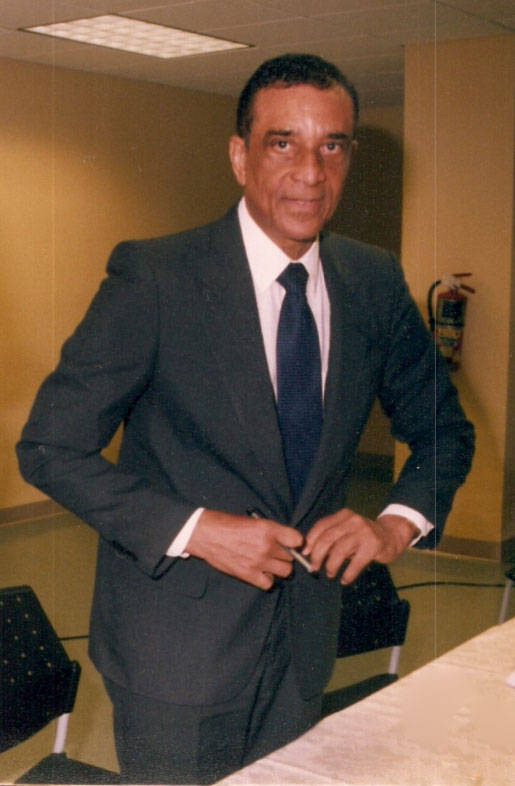
- Born: 5 January 1936 (age 90); Colón, Panama
- Occupations: Writer and scholar
- Website: Justo Arroyo

Justo Arroyo (born Colón, Republic of Panama, 5 January 1936) is a Panamanian writer and scholar, author of several award-winning stories and novels in his country and abroad.

== Trajectory ==
Arroyo obtained a bachelor's degree and later a professorial qualification from the University of Panama, and completed a master's degree and a doctorate in literature at the National Autonomous University of Mexico. He subsequently served as a visiting scholar and lecturer at several universities, and worked as a translator from English and French.

He represented Panama as ambassador to Colombia and participated in numerous academic congresses and seminars across the Americas, Europe, Asia, and Africa. His literary work has been translated into English, German, and Hungarian, and has appeared in various literary anthologies, including Seymour Menton’s The Spanish-American Tale.

In 1982, he served as a juror for the Casa de las Américas Prize in Havana, Cuba.

In 1997, the Simón Bolívar University in Barranquilla, Colombia, awarded him an honorary doctorate (Doctor Honoris Causa) in recognition of his academic and literary contributions.

From 1996 to 1999, he was editor of the Revista Cultural Lotería. In 2000, the Panamanian Chamber of Books named him Writer of the Year.

== Publications ==
- La gayola, short novel, awarded in Guatemala, 1966. Prologue by José de Jesús Martínez.
- Dedos, novel, Editorial Novaro, México, 1970.
- Dejando atrás al hombre de celofán, novel, Ricardo Miró National Literature Award, Panama, 1971.
- Capricornio en gris, tales, Ricardo Miró National Literature Award, Panama, 1972.
- El pez y el segundo, novel, Educa Editorial, Costa Rica, 1978.
- Geografía de mujer, Encuentro Editorial Group, Panama, 1982.
- Rostros como manchas, tales, Ricardo Miró National Literature Award, Panama, 1991.
- Semana sin viernes', novel, Ricardo Miró National Literature Award, Panama, 1995.
- Para terminar diciembre, cuentos, Ricardo Miró National Literature Award, 1995.
- Corazón de águila, novel and biography of Marcos A. Gelabert, Panamanian aviation pioneer, Panama, 1996.
- Héroes a medio tiempo, tales, Rogelio Sinán Centralamerican award, Panama, 1997, prologue by Mempo Giardinelli.
- Lucio Dante resucita, novel, Ricardo Miró National Literature Award, Panamá, 1998. It was selected to become part of the Biblioteca de la Nacionalidad (Nationality Library), Panamá, 1999. Norma Editorial, Second Edition, 2007.
- Sin principio ni fin, novel, Panama, 1999.
- Cuentos de Eduardo, tales, César Candanedo Award, Panama, 2000.
- Réquiem por un duende, tales, Ricardo Miró National Literature Award, Panama, 2002.
- Vida que olvida, novel, Alfaguara, Santillana Group, Madrid, Spain, 2002.
- Otra luz, novel, Ricardo Miró National Literature Award, 2008
