= Stella Sierra =

Panamanian poet and prose writer

Stella Sierra (5 July 1917 – 19 October 1997) was a Panamanian poet and prose writer. Her works centred mainly on love, nature and the joys of living.

== Biography ==
Born in Aguadulce on 5 July 1917, she was placed in the care of her mother after her parents, Alejandro Tapia Escobar and Antonia Sierra Jaén de Tapia, divorced in 1922; she then became known as Stella Sierra. After attending primary school in her home town, she completed her secondary education in Panama City. She graduated from the Colegio Internacional de María Inmaculada in 1934. She then studied Spanish language and literature at Panama University, gaining the teaching qualification of Profesora de Segunda Enseñanza (secondary school teacher) in 1954. By this time she had already published her first book title Sinfonía jubilosa en doce sonetos (Joyful Symphony in Twelve Sonnets) which she followed up with Canciones de mar y luna (Songs of Sea and Moon) in 1944. These two books, irrespective of her later work, are said to have confirmed "her place in Panamanian letters".

After teaching for an extended period in various secondary schools, she became deputy director of the Education Ministry's Department of Culture from 1946 to 1951. She travelled to Spain, where her work was highly acclaimed, as well as to various Latin-American countries and the United States. She also contributed to Panamanian literary journals including Mundo Gráfico and Épocas. From 1951 to 1980, she frequently judged the poetry submissions for the Ricardo Miró literature awards.

== Awards ==
In 1942, she won first prize in the Ricardo Miró competition with her Sinfonia Jubilosa. The work was acclaimed for its "cleanness of language, purity of conception, and its aesthetic dignity".

== Works ==
Sierra's poetry revolves around two main themes: love and nature. Her works include:

- 1942: Sinfonía Jubilosa en doce sonetos, poetry
- 1944: Canciones de Mar y Luna, poetry
- 1947: Libre y Cautiva, poetry
- 1948: Palabras sobre poesía, poetry
- 1949: Cinco poemas, poetry
- 1948: Palabras sobre poesía, essay
- 1965: Presencia del recuerdo, poetry
- 1969: Agua Dulce, childhood memoirs
