= José Franco (poet) =

Panamanian poet and diplomat (1931–2022)

José Franco (24 March 1931 – 9 May 2022) was a Panamanian poet and diplomat.

== Life and career ==
Jośe Franco was born on 24 March 1931 in Calobre, a city in the province of Veraguas of Panama. He served as Ambassador to Argentina, Uruguay and Paraguay. Franco died on 9 May 2022, at the age of 91.

== Literary works ==
- Smilla en Flor, 3 editions (1973–1985)
- La Sangre Derramada (1984)
- Una Cruz Verde en el Camino (1979)
- Coplas y Fábulas a Pelusa (199)
- Redobles al Amanecer (1977)
- Horas Testimoniales (1976)
- Poemas a mi Patria (1975)
- Patria Sagrada (1974)
- Dormir con los Muertos (1974)
- Cantares a la Revolución (1972)
- Proyecto de la Constitución Política de la República de Panamá (1972)
- Patria de Dolor y Llanto (1961)
- Panamá Defendida, 20 editions (1958–1989)
- Sollozos Anónimos (1955)
- El Panteón de los Callejones (1990)
- Las Luciérnagas de la Muerte (1992)

== Awards ==
- 1985 - The National Award for Journalism (Seccion Columna)
- 1984 - The National Award for Journalism (for an Editorial)
- 1979 - The Ricardo Miró National Poetry Award for "Una Cruz Verde en el Camino"
- 1976 - The Ricardo Miró National Theater Award for "Redobles al Amanecer"
- 1975 - The Ricardo Miró national Poetry Award for "Horas Testimoniales"
- 1964 - The National Poetry Award (Honorable Mention) for "Panamá Defendida"
- 1965 - The National Literary Award for "Décimas a mi Patria"
- 1956 - The Bellas Artes Award of the Ministry of Education for "Sollozos Anónimos"
- 1947 - The Student Federation of Panama Award
