= Gil Colunje =

Colombian politician

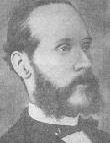

Personal details
- Born: 1 September 1831 Panama, Republic of New Granada
- Died: 6 January 1899 (aged 67) Tabio, Colombia
- Spouse: Rosa Vallarino Miró
- Education: Del Rosario University
- Occupation: politician, lawyer, journalist romantic writer, and poet

Gil Colunje (1 September 1831 – 6 January 1899) was a Colombian politician, lawyer, journalist, romantic writer, and poet. He was an MP in the Federal State of Panama in 1865, magistrate of the Supreme Court of Justice of Colombia.

Colunje took part in the Colombian Civil War of 1854 in Bogotá.

== Biography ==
In his youth, Colunje joined the civic association Los Deseosos de Instrucción, from which he wrote romantic poems that were published in newspapers of the time such as El Panameño, La Estrella de Panamá, El Neogranadino, among others. He founded several newspapers such as El Centinela (1856, together with Pablo Arosemena), La Tribuna Federal (1879) and La Defensa (1880). In 1856, he collaborated with the newspaper El Tiempo of Bogota.

In 1855, he was elected MP to the first Constituent Convention of the Federal State of Panama. In 1856, the Central Government of Bogota appointed him as a senior officer of the Secretariat of State.

Again, in 1859 he was appointed representative of Panama, along with other Panamanians, to the congress of the Grenadine Confederation. There he and five other senators filed an accusation against the president of the Confederation, Mariano Ospina Rodríguez, for having promoted uprisings against the rule of law.
