= Carlos Francisco Chang Marín =

Panamanian writer and artist

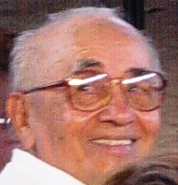
- Born: 26 February 1922; Santiago de Veraguas, Panama
- Died: 5 December 2012 (aged 90); Panama City, Panama
- Other names: Carlos Francisco Changmarín; Changmarín
- Occupations: Writer, painter, folkorist and musician
- Spouse: Eneida Romero

Carlos Francisco Chang Marín or Changmarín (February 26, 1922 – December 5, 2012) was a Panamanian folklorist, painter, musician, journalist, activist and writer of poetry, essays and children's literature.

His writing, which has been described as close to the people's voice, portrays the class struggle and the search for social justice of his countrymen and working class people of the world. His work usually mixes descriptions of the Ibero-American countryside and simple life beauty with naive humour and optimism with proletarian revolution conclusions and tone. This makes his work very popular among the intellectual middle classes and the working classes, specifically the campesinos (countryside people), who identify themselves with Changmarín's personality and language. Changmarín was himself born and raised in the countryside of Panama.

Politically persecuted in the past, Changmarín's contributions to Panamanian culture and folklore added to his internationally recognized talent and forced otherwise antagonistic institutions such as the government to recognize his achievements. He has won several national awards (see Awards below).

== Biography ==
Changmarín was the artistic name used by Carlos Francisco Chang Marín, which comes from merging both of his surnames (from his paternal surname "Chang" and maternal surname "Marin"). It expresses his mixed (Chinese and Creole) heritage.

Changmarín was born in Los Leones, Santiago de Veraguas, Panama, being the second son of an out-of-wedlock union between Carlos Chang, a rich, Chinese-Panamanian merchant, and Faustina Marin, a campesina. He grew up among his mother's family, being unable to be acknowledged in public by his father under the conservative values of Panama's countryside of the early 1920s. However, later his father decided to take him from his mother when he was still a child and sent him to live with a paternal aunt. His aunt was brutally abusive, treating him basically as a slave, constantly humiliating his mixed heritage and his mother's social status. The father, although not participating in the abuse, provided no protection from it and even promoted this behavior in some cases.

It is not known when Changmarín left his aunt's house, but he went to Panama City, where he did a series of odd jobs. One of these jobs included working at the Panama Canal under the supervision of U.S. managers, where he witnessed the unfair and abusive conditions between the U.S. personnel and the non-U.S. workers. This added to similar experiences he had had while living with his aunt, who belonged to the richer sector of her hometown. He became determined to establish his proletarian struggle visions and political activism.

Changmarín returned to formal education at the Juan Demostenes Arosemena Normal School (founded in 1938). He was mentored by intellectuals from South America and Europe, most of whom were victims of European fascism, which helped to consecrate and refine his ideals. He also undertook brief studies in the Panama National Conservatory of Music, which he did not complete.

Between 1940 and 1950, Changmarín worked as a teacher in several provinces, where he organized the student movement in strikes to denounce key issues regarding the country's social problems. This resulted in his being fired from his post.

During this period, he was incarcerated several times, but this did not stop him from working in several jobs while in prison. He estimates that he spent some four years of his life behind bars. After being in and out of prison under political charges, Changmarín was finally exiled to Chile in 1968. While living there, he studied painting at the Universidad National de Chile and became very active in the Salvador Allende presidential campaign.

Once he was allowed to return to Panama, Changmarín established himself in several leadership and organizational roles within the Communist movement. He continuously worked in his artistic endeavours to deliver social and cultural messages. During this period resulted he was nationally recognized as one of the persons responsible for the Panama Canal struggle against the United States. This struggle ended with the United States returning the operational control of the Canal Zone, which used to be forbidden for Panamanians.

Until his death from stomach cancer, Changmarín lived in his birth town of Santiago de Veraguas with his companion Eneida Romero. He continued to write, paint and participate in political and ecological commentary and activism. The couple had five children, with four of these still living. In addition, it is well known that Changmarín had a passion for nature in general, with a predilection for orchids.

== Writings ==
As one of the main Panamanian writers, his work in literature is prolific. During his career, Changmarín has touched on different genres and styles.

=== Poetry ===
Changmarín started writing poetry by the time he was in high school(Juan Demóstenes Arosemena Normal School), mentored at that early period of his artistic life by South American and European teachers, the latter mainly being expatriated victims of the fascist Spanish Franquism. While still in college, he received an honored mention for his participation in the 1942 Ricardo Miró National Awards with a submission of a book containing poetry entitled Punto e' llanto.

At this stage, his work was considered to be part of the Ibero-American's post-vanguardists Second World War authors according to several scholars. Being under the vanguardist influence, his poetry developed a tone of despair with a very obvious revolutionary intent.

Dimas L. Pitty, in his book Letra Viva, describes Changmarín's work as a creation where "the art is not the reality, but reality's reflection as an artistic image, marked with the author's subjectivism and ideological views; it is also his fiction".

As a writer, poetry is basically Changmarín's fundamental tool of expression. Once established as a consecrated poet, he reached an outstanding moment in his creation with the book of poetry entitled Poemas Corporales (Corporeal Poems), which was awarded the Ricardo Miró National Award in 1955. With this work, Changmarín showed himself as a developed poet who has achieved great control over this literary form. Changmarín leaves out as much as possible, which mirrors the trends of the time. This clarity serves as a method to deliver the social and political messages, as most of his works are fundamental. His mastery of the decasyllable writing imprints Poemas Corporales with a classical accent comparable to the Quevedo Verses.

=== Short stories ===
Changmarín's short story collections are quite numerous and touch upon several themes and scopes. He tries to recreate the countryside storytelling and atmosphere to expose the problems concerning land ownership and exploitation suffered by the countryside people. The latifundia is still very common in Ibero-America. It is endorsed by the government, religious as well as right-wing policy-makers (who generally represent the rich sectors of the society) and transnational corporations.

As are most of his works, the short stories are highly political in nature, describing and portraying historical events, as seen in his compendium Noche Buena Mala. Here, stories are related to the events of the 1989 U.S. Military invasion of Panama in (December 20, 1989).

When not being used as a way to deliver and expose political, historical and eco-humanistic paradigms, his short stories have been described to be highly emotional and profoundly radical in form. An example of this is his work Seis Madres, possibly being the most researched and analyzed of his works in this genre. It has been described as written by bursts of raw emotions; an anti-story, and as the first Panamanian short story that could be used to formulate a theory regarding the creative writing process.

=== Novels ===
Changmarín has published three novels. He mainly writes in a historical narrative style which has been praised by critics for its attention to detail in the description of the physical frame (flora, fauna, geography) as well as the cultural frame. Changmarín alluded to Victoriano Lorenzo in almost all his larger works for adults and children in an effort to place him as a founding father of Panama. To Chang Marín, Lorenzo was the first true Panamanian whose life story and identity parallel that of Panama as a nation.

His latest novel, targeted mainly to young readers, Las Gracias y las Desgracias de Chico Perico (2005), had a more autobiographical approach.

=== Children's literature ===
Having published several books dedicated to reach the youth, Changmarín tries to deliver his social messages in order to promote human sensibilities and awareness to all ages. Through children's literature, he takes advantage of his pedagology formation by using a profound knowledge of the popular and simple art and language.

Using attractive illustrations (hand-drawn by himself) and a short-chapter format to ease the interest of young readers, Changmarín has published in several fields, from poetry to history books. Many scholars consider his children's literature works an expression of his tender side without losing his message and they place many of his works in this area as jewels of Panamanian literature.

Part of his creation in this field is inspired by his own experiences as a child and by the constant interaction with his own grand and great-grandchildren, to whom most of these books have been dedicated.

Highly recognized in this area are his poems Las Tonadas y los Cuentos de la Cigarra (1975) and La Muñeca de Tusa (2001) and the novels El Cholito Que Llegó a General (1978) and Las Gracias y las Desgracias de Chico Perico (2005).

=== Essays ===
Changmarín's works in the field of essays concentrate on the folkloric, artistic, historical and political areas. Many of his essays have been published in international magazines and newspapers.

Most of his political essays deal with the relations between the United States of America's policies toward the Panama Canal and Panama in general, as well as its economic models and the impact these have in the region.

As a strong proponent of socialism, Changmarín's conclusions portray a critical view to the current international policies of the United States and other pro-globalization countries and organizations such as World Trade Organization, International Monetary Fund and World Bank.

=== Journalism ===
As a journalist, Changmarín has a long history contributing with commentaries and opinions appearing in several Panamanian and international newspapers, especially the Cuban newspaper Granma. He is highlighted among several others (Milciades Amores C, Mario Riera Pinilla, Alejandro Chock Valdés, Gonzalo Castro, René González and Eustolio Darío Him) as a pioneer of the Prensa Chica ("small press") movement in Panama, with his participation in El Cholo newspaper.

For several years, he had his own newspaper column, Las Famosas Cartas a Tula (The famous letters to my Aunt Tula), in one of the most widely circulated newspapers, La Critica. His column was popular due to his humorous approach to contemporary problems.

Parallel to his contributions to the mainstream media, Changmarín founded and directed the weekly bulletin Unidad, an information bulletin publication for the Panamanian Communist Party.

== Music ==
In the field of music, Changmarín has produced a long list of compositions, both in writing lyrics and creating the musical arrangements. One of his best-known creations comprise the lyrics for Tio Caiman, made famous by the Chilean group Quilapayún. The piece has also been recorded in Colombia, Nicaragua, Cuba, and Panama by several music groups. The piece is sometimes sung by spectators in soccer matches and performed at music concerts across Ibero-America. Changmarín is hardly known as the creator, but this is a credit that he does not pursue. The Panamanian Birthday Song, recorded by the DEXA orchestra directed by Edgardo Quintero, is also one of his creations and is considered to be a unique contribution to the Panamanian culture and identity.

Another of his records is Alma Panameña, which was produced as part of the cultural development programs of the European Union and PROAPEMEP.

=== Décima ===
Changmarín is a broadly recognized décima composer in Panama. His interest in this field is related to his folklore research and he has been promoting the recognition of this form of expression of the countryside people for more than half a century. As the main coordinator for the Veraguas delegations in the Mejorana National Festival (since 1950), he has become a one-man cultural institution in this art form.

Changmarín is the only Panamanian décima composer who published three books dealing with décima composition as well as décimas compilations. The books Socabón, Décimas Populares para Cantar (1959), Los Versos del Pueblo (1973) and Cantadera, 130 Décimas para Cantar (1995) have been used as references and inspiration to generations of décimas performers.

== Activism ==
=== Political ===
Changmarín's political activism reached an important moment in his life with the foundation of the Panamanian Communist Party (Partido del Pueblo) in 1950. Since communism was outlawed at that time by Panamanian law, this initiative was forced to be conducted secretly. The Panamanian government reacted to the growing dissent and communist organization in the countryside by increasing repression, reaching the extremes of perpetrating political assassinations and disappearances.

Changmarín used his writings as his main weapon for resistance. For years, he used politically charged décimas as means to educate the people about identity and the struggle at hand. Que se vayan del Canal (I wish they would just leave from the Canal) and Quiero Sembrar un Maíz (I want to plant corn in the Canal Zone) were the songs of the protests against the constant abuse by the United States.

His clear and direct writing form serves as a tool for the constant struggles and protests that were taking place in Ibero-America during the 1970s and 1980s. The décima, having a bard-like effect as an artistic expression and Changmarín having mastered the form, managed to merge it with the social angst-ridden echoes of the dispossessed and the nationalist feelings of the people to "incense a protest in each fist and a march in each step".

=== Ecological ===
Changmarín was a strong proponent of an environmental-friendly way of life and critic of the consumer-oriented free market and industrialization. Having a strong emotional connection with the countryside environment, he actively participates in radio shows commentaries about the topic.

Moreover, he expressed an integrated relationship between culture and nature, rejecting the industrial Western concept of progress, instead promoting the philosophy of simple life. Although he never openly endorsed Anarcho-Primitivism, there are clear correlations between his views and the movement.

== Works ==
=== Poetry ===
- Romance de la Niña Perdida
- Punto ‘e llanto (1942)
- Poemas Corporales (1956)
- Socabón. Décimas para Cantar (1959)
- Los Versos del Pueblo. Décimas (1972)
- Versos para Entrar a la Zona del Canal (1972)
- Crónica de Siete Nombres Memorables (1980)
- El Gallo de las Horas (1993)
- Cantadera – 130 Décimas para Cantar (1995)

=== Short stories ===
- Faragual y otros cuentos (1960)
- La Mansión de la Bruma, Cuentos de la cárcel. Publicada en ruso (1965)
- Nochebuena Mala (1995)
- Las Mentiras Encantadas (1997)
- Cuentos para Matar el Estrés (2002)

=== Novel ===
- El Guerrillero Transparente (1982)

=== Children's literature ===
- Versos de Machachita; poetry (1974)
- Las Tonadas y los Cuentos de la Cigarra; poetry (1975)
- El Cholito que Llegó a General; novel (1978)
- Las Tonadas y los Cuentos de la Cigarra; poetry (1993)
- La Muñeca de Tusa; poetry (2001)
- Muñeca de Tusa; poetry (2003)
- Las Gracias y las Desgracias de Chico Perico; novel (2005)

=== Essays ===
- Base Social de la Décima en Panamá (1965)
- Algunas Áreas Folclóricas de Veraguas (1975)
- Panamá 1903-1970 (1979)
- Victoriano Lorenzo, Primera Víctima del Canal Norteamericano (1980)
- Vigencia de la Décima en Panamá, en Itinerario de una Nación 1903-2003 (2003)

=== Discography ===
- Tío Caimán
- El Cumpleaños Panameño
- Alam Panameña

== Awards ==
=== Ricardo Miró National Award ===
- 1942: Honorable mention: Punto ‘e Llanto (poetry)
- 1956: Second Prize: Poemas Corporales (poetry)
- 1959: Second Prize: Faragual (short story)
- 1981: First Prize: El Guerrillero Transparente (novel)

=== Other awards ===
- 1976: Special Prize at the Cuban Workers Centre's Rubén Martínez Villena Awards (poetry category).
- 1998: Dora Zàrate Award for his contribution promoting national identity and culture.
- 2002: Ester María Osses Award of the Instituto Nacional de Cultura (National Culture Institute), Panama (children's literature category).
- 2002: Universidad 2002 Award of the Universidad de Panamá.
- 2002: Medal of Honour of the Asociación Nacional de Poetas de la Décima (Décima Poets National Association), Panama.
- 2003: Labour and Effort Award and recognition in the Chinese-Panamanian community of Asociación China de Mujeres Profesionales (Chinese Association of Professional Women), Panama.
- 2003: Recognition from the Santiago de Veraguas Municipal Council.
- 2004: Medal and recognition of the Cuba Republic State Council.
- 2006: Omar Torrijos Herrera National Order of the Panamanian government.
- 2006: Rogelio Sinán Medal of the Consejo Nacional de Escritores y Escritoras de Panama.

In addition to these awards, several public and private libraries have been named after Changmarín.
