= Erika McLeod =

New Zealand alpine skier (born 1981)

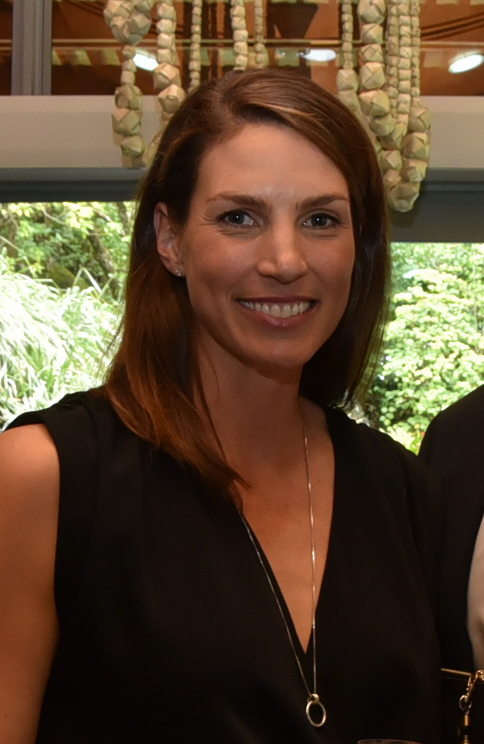
McLeod (now Harris) in 2020

Erika Louise McLeod (now Harris; born 1981) is an alpine skier from New Zealand.

In New Zealand at the 2006 Winter Olympics at Turin, she came 40th in the Slalom. She married real estate agent Mark Harris and as of 2020, she lives in Queenstown.
