= Rogelio Sinán =

Panamanian writer, poet, and playwright (1902–1994)

- Born: Bernardo Domínguez Alba; April 25, 1902; Taboga Island, Panama
- Died: October 4, 1994 (aged 92); Panama City, Panama
- Education: Instituto Nacional de Panamá; universities in Chile, Italy, Mexico
- Alma mater: National Autonomous University of Mexico
- Occupations: Writer, playwright, poet, diplomat
- Writing career
- Pen name: Rogelio Sinán
- Language: Spanish
- Genres: Poetry, short stories, novels, theatre, essays
- Notable works: Onda, Plenilunio, La isla mágica
- Notable awards: Ricardo Miró Prize; Inter-American Short Story Prize; Alejo Carpentier Prize
- Literary movement: Avant-garde literature, Surrealism

Rogelio Sinán (born on Taboga Island in 1902; died in 1994) was the pseudonym of Panamanian writer Bernardo Domínguez Alba. He went to universities in Chile and Italy before becoming a consul to Calcutta. He has written plays, short stories and novels, but is best known for his poetry. His work has been termed Avant-garde and he is a winner of the Premio Ricardo Miró.

== Early life and education ==
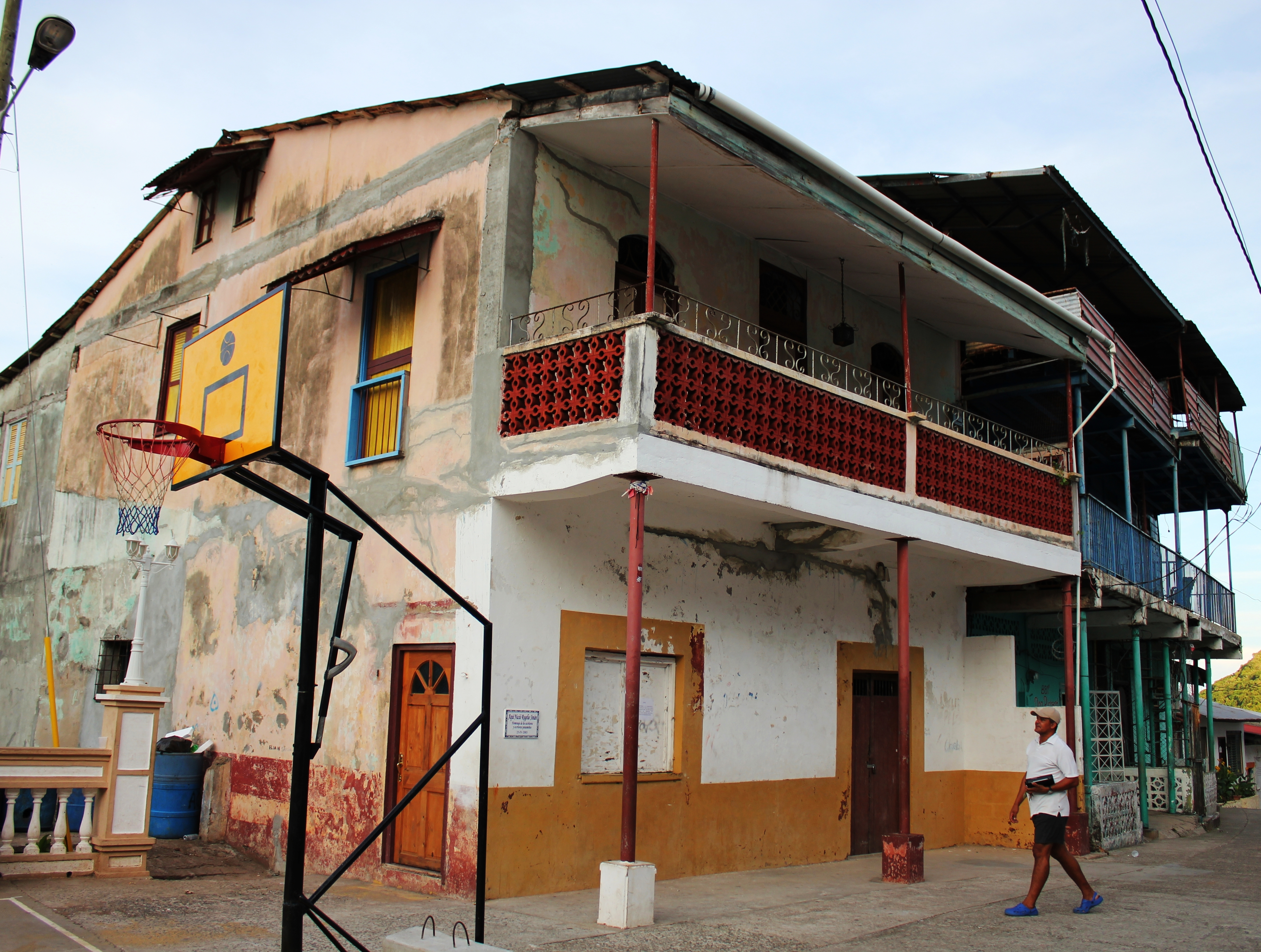
House of Rogelio Sinan in Taboga Island

Sinán was born as Bernardo Domínguez Alba on April 25, 1902, on the island of Taboga, Panama. He grew up in a large family and spent his early childhood on the island before moving to Panama City, a transition that exposed him to both insular folklore and urban intellectual life.

During childhood, Sinán suffered from chronic asthma, a condition that restricted physical activity and contributed to his early immersion in reading and writing as sustained intellectual pursuits. He completed his secondary education at the Instituto Nacional de Panamá, graduating in 1923 with a degree in humanities.

Seeking broader cultural and literary formation, Sinán pursued university studies abroad, beginning in Chile, where he came into direct contact with major figures of Latin American poetry and the emerging currents of modernism and postmodernism. His academic training continued in Europe, including studies in Rome, and later in Mexico at the National Autonomous University of Mexico, where he specialised in dramatic arts. This multidisciplinary education provided him with formal tools that would later inform his work as a playwright, short-story writer, and novelist.

== Literary beginnings and pseudonym ==
Upon returning to Panama, Domínguez Alba adopted the literary pseudonym Rogelio Sinán as part of a conscious effort to construct an independent artistic identity distinct from his civil name. Under this pseudonym, he began publishing poetry that diverged sharply from the dominant romantic and modernist aesthetics then prevalent in Panamanian literature.

His first major publication, the poetry collection Onda (1929), written and published in Italy, marked a decisive break with earlier poetic conventions and is widely regarded as the foundational text of literary avant-gardism in Panama. The work introduced experimental imagery, surrealist techniques, and a reconfiguration of poetic language that would influence subsequent generations of Panamanian writers.

== Academic, cultural, and diplomatic career ==
After establishing himself as a leading literary innovator, Sinán pursued a parallel career in education and public service. He taught Spanish literature at the Instituto Nacional de Panamá, and later served as a professor of dramatic arts at the University of Panama, where he contributed to the institutional development of humanities education. His pedagogical work emphasised literary experimentation, critical reading, and aesthetic rigour, influencing a few generations of Panamanian writers.

Sinán also held diplomatic posts that broadened his international engagement. He served as First Secretary of the Panamanian Embassy in Mexico and was appointed Consul of Panama in Calcutta, India, in 1938. These assignments enabled sustained contact with intellectual circles abroad and reinforced his role as a cultural mediator between Panama and the wider literary world.

In Panama, he occupied senior cultural positions within the Ministry of Education, including Director of the Department of Fine Arts and Publications. Between 1946 and 1947, he edited the book series Biblioteca selecta, a project aimed at strengthening national literary circulation and preserving Panamanian intellectual production. He was also an active participant in international writers’ congresses and frequently served as a juror for major literary prizes in Latin America, including the Casa de las Américas Prize in Havana.

== Literary style and significance ==
Sinán is considered one of the figures associated with the emergence of literary avant-garde tendencies in Panama, particularly through his use of surrealist and experimental techniques that diverged from earlier romantic and modernist traditions. His early poetry introduced nontraditional approaches to syntax, imagery, and thematic organization, contributing to new forms of expression in Panamanian literature.

In his poetry, fiction, and drama, recurring elements include dreamlike structures, symbolic settings, psychological conflict, and moral ambiguity. Although his work is not primarily political in nature, it has been interpreted as engaging with themes such as social conformity, authoritarianism, and moral constraint, often through allegorical or fantastic modes.

Literary critics have drawn comparisons between Sinán’s narrative techniques and those of writers such as Jorge Luis Borges and Alejo Carpentier, particularly regarding nonlinear temporality, mythic frameworks, and the use of symbolic space. At the same time, his work is generally situated within a Panamanian cultural context, incorporating insular settings, tropical imagery, and themes related to the social and cultural dynamics of the isthmus.

== Awards and honours ==
Sinán received numerous literary awards during his lifetime. He was awarded the Ricardo Miró National Prize for the novel Plenilunio in 1943 and again received the same prize for poetry in 1949 for Semana Santa en la niebla. In 1949, he also won the Inter-American Short Story Prize.

Later in his career, he received a third Ricardo Miró Prize, this time for the novel La isla mágica in 1977. He was a member of the Panamanian Academy of Language and was awarded the highest national decorations granted by the Republic of Panama, including the orders of Vasco Núñez de Balboa, Manuel Amador Guerrero, and Manuel José Hurtado.

In 1989, the University of Panama conferred upon him the degree of Doctor Honoris Causa in recognition of his cultural and academic contributions. He was also honoured internationally, including with Cuba’s Alejo Carpentier Prize for his contribution to Latin American literature.

== Death ==
Sinán died on October 4, 1994, in Panama City at the age of 92.

== Legacy ==
On April 23, 2010, the Rogelio Sinán Memorial was inaugurated at the Technological University of Panama, housing his personal library, manuscripts, correspondence, and personal artifacts donated by his family. The memorial functions both as a documentation center for researchers and as a cultural venue for literary workshops, readings, and awards ceremonies.

In his honour, Panama established the Rogelio Sinán National Literature Prize, awarded for lifetime achievement to distinguished Panamanian writers, reinforcing his enduring influence on the country’s literary identity.

== Works ==
=== Poetry ===
- Onda (1929)
- Incendio (1944)
- Semana Santa en la niebla (1969)
- Saloma sin sal o mar (1969)
- Poesía completa de Rogelio Sinán (2000)

=== Short story collections ===
- A la orilla de las estatuas maduras (1946)
- Todo un conflicto de sangre (1946)
- Dos aventuras en el lejano oriente (1947)
- La boina roja y otros cuentos (1954)
- Los pájaros del sueño (1957)
- Cuna común (1963)
- Cuentos de Rogelio Sinán (1971)
- Homenaje a Rogelio Sinán: poesía y cuento (1982)
- El candelabro de los malos ofidios y otros cuentos (1982)

=== Novels ===
- Plenilunio (1947)
- La isla mágica (1979)

=== Theatre ===
- La cucarachita mandinga (1937)
- Chiquilinga (1961)
- Lobo go home
- Comuníqueme con Dios
- El nuevo pecado original

=== Essays ===
- Los valores humanos en la lírica de Maples Arce (1959)
