= Carlos Wynter Melo =

Panamanian writer (born 1971)

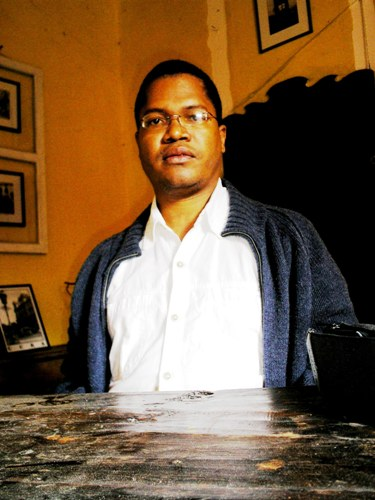

Carlos Oriel Wynter Melo (born 1971) is a Panamanian writer. He was born in Panama City, to an agronomist father and an architect mother. His paternal grandparents came from Jamaica at the time of the construction of the Panama Canal, while his maternal grandparents were of Criollo origin. He trained as an industrial engineer at the Instituto Tecnológico de Estudios Superiores de Occidente in Guadalajara, Mexico and has since taught at a number of Panamanian universities. Among his books are Ojos para ver una invasión (2015), Mujeres que desaparecen (2016), and El escapista y otras reapariciones (2007). His work has been translated in German, English and Portuguese. In 2007, he was named in the Bogota39 list of the promising young writers in Latin America.
