= José María Sánchez Borbón =

Panamanian writer and politician (1918–1973)

José María Sánchez
- Born: José María Sánchez Borbón; 25 July 1918; Solarte Island, Bocas del Toro, Panama
- Died: 8 November 1973 (aged 55); Panama City, Panama
- Education: Universidad de Panama
- Occupation: Writer
- Relatives: Guillermo Sánchez Borbón, Olga Sánchez
- Writing career
- Period: 1937–1973
- Genre: Short stories

José María Sánchez Borbón (Solarte Island, 25 July 1918 – Panama City, 8 November 1973), was a Panamanian writer and politician.

== Early life ==
He was born on Solarte Island, in the Bocas del Toro Archipelago, on July 25, 1918. Sánchez Borbón attended primary school in San Jose, Costa Rica. In 1938 he graduated from the Instituto Nacional de Panama as Bachelor in Literature and then as lawyer at the University of Panama.

== Career ==
He worked in his father's business in Bocas del Toro during the 1940s and 1950s. He joined the Panamanian government from 1956 to 1968. During the 1960s, Sánchez was Panamanian ambassador to Colombia and Argentina.

His short stories, some of them translated to German, French, English and Russian, are of importance to Panamanian literature. He began publishing in 1937. He "showed the validity of the social" as well as regional themes in the national literature, at that time oriented towards the avant-garde.

"With José María Sánchez the region imposes its presence [to the Nation]. His short-stories are a faithful transcript of the adventures of his native land, Bocas del Toro. On a physical landscape of plural violence – rain, forest, sea -, economic and demographic factors concur to offer us a special sociological precipitate. Sánchez is the involuntary chronicler of that dramatic occurrence, where the exuberant nature and the United Fruit Company provides the terms within which move a population composed mostly of blacks from the English Antilles. His intuition of natural life and his human sympathy help to shape the fabric of his creation."--Rodrigo Miró, El cuento en Panamá".

== Works ==
- Tres cuentos (Panama, 1946)
- Shumió-Ara (Panama, 1948)
- Cuentos de Bocas del Toro (posthumous publication, Panama, 1994)

== Literary prizes ==
- First Prize, Christmas Story Contest 1947, La Estrella de Panamá newspaper, with the short-story Embrujos de navidad
- First Prize, Christmas Story Contest 1948, La Estrella de Panamá newspaper, with the short-story Una aclaración necesaria

== Legacy ==
- 1o de junio, Día de la Literatura en la provincia de Bocas del Toro (June 1, Literature Day in the Bocas del Toro Province) – To celebrate life and literary work of José María Sánchez and Guillermo Sánchez Borbón
- Premio Nacional de Cuento "José María Sánchez" (Short-Stories National Prize "José María Sánchez) – Organized annually by the Universdad Tecnológica de Panamá since 1996 to award the best Short Story book of each year.
