= Tomás Martín Feuillet =

Panamanian poet, soldier, and civil servant (1832–1862)

- Born: 18 September 1832; Panama City, Republic of New Granada
- Died: February 1862 (aged 29); Piendamó, Cauca, Granadine Confederation (present-day Colombia)
- Resting place: Panama City (remains returned March 1866)
- Occupations: Poet, soldier, civil servant
- Writing career
- Language: Spanish
- Period: 1850s–1862
- Genre: Poetry
- Notable works: "La Flor del Espíritu Santo" "Los Caracoles" "¿Cuánto tiene?"
- Movement: Romanticism

Tomás Martín Feuillet (18 September 1832 – February 1862) was a Romantic poet, soldier, and civil servant from the Isthmus of Panama, then part of the Granadine Confederation. Later critics have regarded him as a leading figure of Panama's first generation of Romantic poets. He is best remembered for "La Flor del Espíritu Santo", a poem dedicated to one of Panama's native flowers and widely considered his finest work.

== Early life ==
Tomás Martín Feuillet was born on 18 September 1832 in Panama City, at the home of a woman named Leandra Morales, and was taken almost immediately into the household of José Martín and Juliana Feuillet (originally spelled Fevillet), a French-born couple who had married in Panama City in 1822 and lived near the Plaza de Santa Ana. Later accounts suggest the arrangement had been agreed in advance between the couple and the child's biological father. He was born out of wedlock, and the couple, who had no other children, raised and treated him as their own son. The name by which he is commonly known reflects this history: "Martín", his adoptive father's given name, came to be used in practice as a second forename, while his adoptive mother's surname was gradually altered by common usage from Fevillet to Feuillet.

The identity of his biological parents was never conclusively established. Some 20th-century writers, notably Guillermo Andreve, identified Leandra Morales as his biological mother and placed his birth in La Chorrera, but later research found no independent support for either claim. Drawing on a series of notarial declarations, including a 1848 statement by José Martín and a 1852 will made by the Cuban-born Panama businessman Juan Bautista Feraud, the literary historian Rodrigo Miró argued that Feraud was the more probable biological father, a conclusion also supported by oral family tradition; the identity of his mother, however, remained undetermined.

His adoptive mother died on 22 March 1846. Following the death of his adoptive father around June 1848, he inherited property that gave him a comfortable, if not large, income. His circumstances improved further after the death of Juan Bautista Feraud on 7 November 1853, when a payment of several thousand pesos held in trust for him, together with accrued interest, was released to him by Feraud's widow. It was around this time, through documents connected with Feraud's estate, that Feuillet appears to have learned of the uncertainty surrounding his origins, a discovery that caused him lasting private distress and coloured much of his later poetry.

== Education ==
Feuillet received such schooling as was locally available before travelling to Bogotá to continue his studies. He was recorded as living in the Colombian capital by June 1848. While there he contracted typhoid fever, an illness that forced him to abandon his studies and, according to one account, left him permanently lame in one leg. Martínez Ortega places this illness in his childhood rather than during his time in Bogotá, so sources are not entirely consistent on when it occurred. He subsequently travelled to Jamaica to continue his education, and was reported to still be abroad in October 1852. He had returned to the Isthmus of Panama by early 1853, roughly four months later, and that year joined the citizen patrols organised to help keep order in the capital.

== Career ==
=== Public and military service ===
Feuillet held a succession of minor civil and military posts in Panama during the mid-1850s. In January 1856, amid unrest in the Department of Herrera, he was appointed adjunct to the general staff of a punitive column organised by the state government; the following month he embarked with the vice-governor, Francisco de Fábrega, on an expedition that passed through Pesé, Los Santos and Macaracas before being dissolved in March. He was named lieutenant of the department's militia infantry in May 1856 and, days later, adjutant to the gendarmerie of the capital district, a post he resigned by the end of September. He went on to serve, briefly and on an interim basis, as public interpreter from January 1857 and as a primary-school teacher in Santa Ana, resigning from the latter post as well. In August 1857, he received 123 votes in elections for departmental representative. In February 1858, he took charge of the mayor's office as first alternate to the sitting mayor, and that December he was elected to the city council.

In early 1860 he granted power of attorney to Dr. José Francisco de la Ossa and travelled to Peru, reportedly under contract to the newspaper El Sol de Piura, in whose pages he published a number of poems marked by dark humour. He returned to Panama in December 1860, shortly after the birth of a son, whose mother was Vicenta Costa. Some of his last surviving verses were addressed to the child. In January 1861, he was among a group of citizens who signed a letter to the state governor urging that the Isthmus be kept out of the civil war then affecting other states of the Granadine Confederation.

=== Literary career ===
Feuillet's literary debut is usually dated to 1854, when he wrote his earliest known verses. Poems from 1855 also survive. He contributed to "La Floresta Istmeña," a poetry section that the newspaper El Panameño began publishing on 9 April 1856, and was a member of the recently founded Sociedad Literaria. He also wrote regularly for El Centinela in Panama and for Colombian newspapers. Over his short career he produced an estimated sixty poems, but – despite being financially comfortable enough not to need the income – he never collected them into a book; many survive only through periodicals or through the personal albums of women he knew socially.

His best-known and most admired poem is "La Flor del Espíritu Santo," inspired by one of Panama's distinctive native flowers. Other frequently cited works include "Los Caracoles," also valued for its treatment of the Panamanian landscape, and the socially critical "¿Cuánto tiene?" ("How Much [Does He Have]?") A three-and-a-half-act verse comedy, Dios y Ayuda, was staged by an amateur theatrical company in June 1858. Manuel Gamboa, a friend of the poet, separately recalled a full-length verse drama that Feuillet was said to have burned himself in a fit of despair, leaving only fragments, if any, behind.

His 1856 poem "Al ciudadano gobernador D. Bartolomé Calvo," published on 2 October of that year in El Centinela, is credited by Martínez Ortega as the first work by a Panamanian poet to explicitly defend Panama's sovereignty against the expansionist ambitions of the United States, a concern that reflected wider anxieties of his generation over North American immigration accompanying the construction of the Panama Railroad.

== Cauca campaign and death ==
On 13 February 1861, Feuillet embarked with the forces of the Colombian poet and general Julio Arboleda, bound for the conflict in the Cauca region, holding the rank of captain and serving as Arboleda's secretary. He took part in the battle of Los Árboles on 31 July and in the capture of Popayán on 10 August 1861. According to one account he was promoted to sergeant major some months later in recognition of his conduct.

Following the battle of Silvia on 11 January 1862, in which the young officer Miguel Arboleda – a relative of Julio Arboleda and son of Manuel Antonio Arboleda – was among the casualties, Feuillet accompanied Manuel Antonio Arboleda on a mission to negotiate the exchange of prisoners in the hope of recovering his son. They found only the young man's body. While lodging overnight in a roadside house during the return journey, both Feuillet and Manuel Antonio Arboleda were attacked and killed by a group of Pijao fighters. In a report later given to the Senate of Colombia, the Colombian politician Jorge Holguín described the attack: Arboleda was blinded by the first bayonet thrusts, which struck his eyes; Feuillet, drawing his sword to intervene, had his right hand nearly severed by a sabre blow and his face slashed, after which the two men fought on with stools, tables and whatever else came to hand before being overwhelmed. Feuillet, pierced by fourteen bayonet wounds, was said to have met his death "like the ancient gladiators, in the most beautiful attitude".

Feuillet died before reaching the age of thirty. Martínez Ortega gives his age at death as thirty. In March 1866, his remains were returned to Panama through the efforts of Luis R. Alfaro.

== Legacy ==
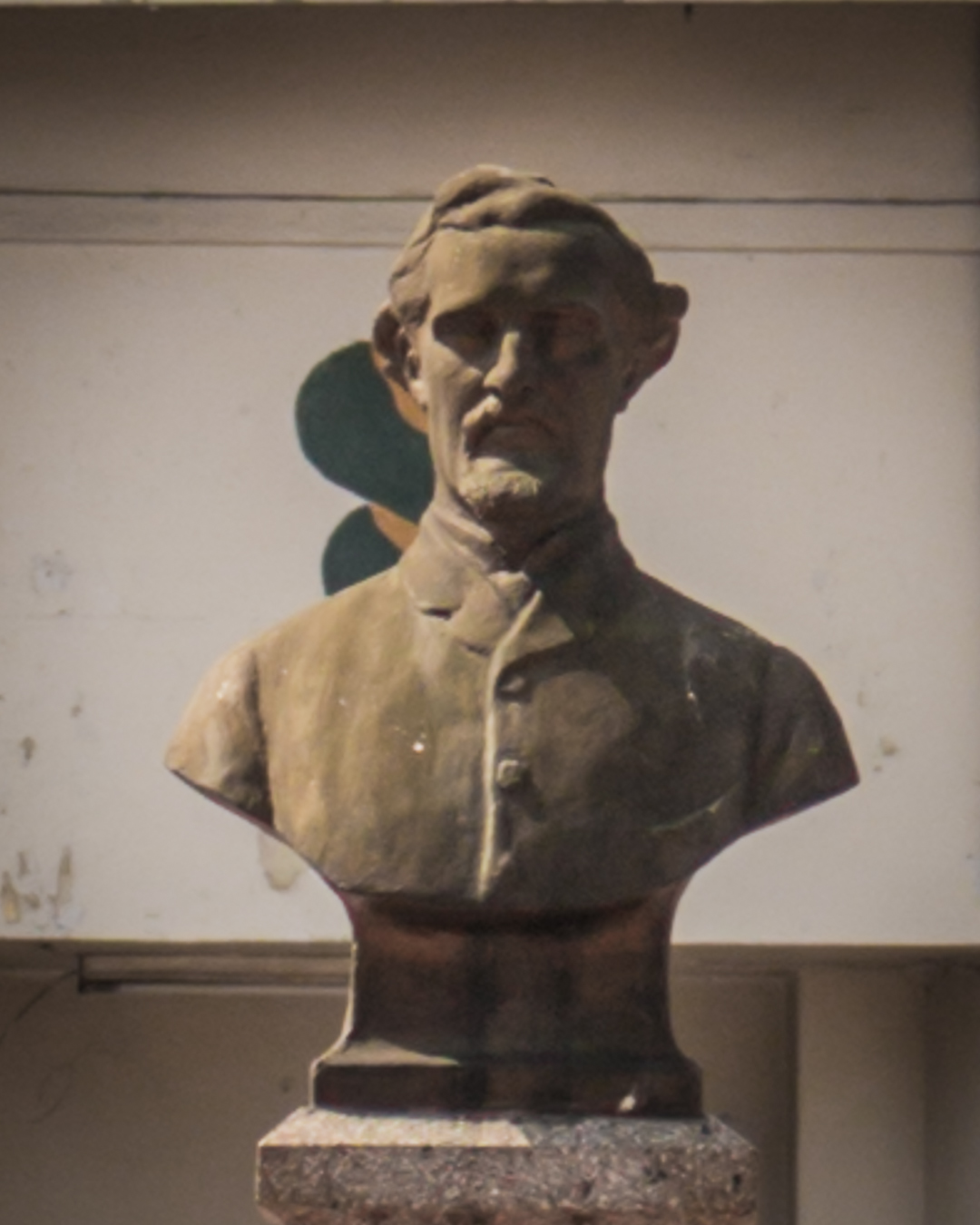
The monument of Tomás Martín Feuillet

Feuillet left no surviving autograph manuscripts or texts he had personally authorised for publication, and his poems survived only in periodicals and in manuscript notebooks kept, in part, at Panama's national museum. His friend Manuel Gamboa, who began compiling his poems as early as 1858, wrote a biographical memoir, Recuerdo Biográfico, after the poet's death; it was published in New York. In 1870 another contemporary, José María Alemán, published a critical essay on Feuillet in El Crepúsculo, a literary periodical of his own.

During the early 20th century, Guillermo Andreve devoted several further notes to Feuillet, drawing in part on family tradition transmitted by Juana de Dios Soto, described as the poet's maternal grandmother, who had helped raise him. In June 1918 Andreve published a selection of sixteen of Feuillet's poems as the inaugural volume of his Biblioteca de Cultura Nacional series, an edition that has remained the principal published source for the poet's work.

Miró first discussed Feuillet at length in his 1948 study El Romanticismo en Panamá: La Primera Generación Poética del Istmo, relying largely on material gathered by Andreve and Alemán; in a more thoroughly documented later study, Tomás Martín Feuillet: prototipo romántico (1963), he revised several previously accepted details of the poet's biography, including his birth year and the likely identity of his biological father. In 1974 the scholar Diógenes Cedeño Cenci published a book-length study of Feuillet's life and work, situating it within the broader development of Romantic poetry in Panama.

== Selected works ==
- "Soneto" ("Sonnet"), 1855
- "La Flor del Espíritu Santo" ("The Flower of the Holy Spirit"), 1 October 1856
- "Al Ciudadano Gobernador D. Bartolomé Calvo" ("To the Citizen Governor D. Bartolomé Calvo"), 2 October 1856
- "Fé, Esperanza y Caridad" ("Faith, Hope, and Charity"), 1856
- "¿Cuánto tiene?" ("How Much Does He Have?"), 1856
- "En el Álbum de la Srta. Dolores Hurtado" ("In the Album of Miss Dolores Hurtado"), 1856
- "Retrato" ("Portrait"), February 1857
- "¡Quédate así!" ("Stay Like That!"), October 1857
- "A Juanita" ("To Juanita"), October 1857
- "La Cruz de 'San José'" ("The Cross of 'San José'"), 1857
- "Décimas a mi amigo Ignacio Hurtado" ("Décimas to My Friend Ignacio Hurtado"), 1857
- "Los Caracoles" ("The Snails"), 1857
- "A María (Plegaria)" ("To María (Prayer)"), 1858
- "En la tumba de la Srta. Josefa Hurtado" ("At the Tomb of Miss Josefa Hurtado"), 5 November 1858
- "Recuerdo" ("Memory"), 1860
- "La Palomita" ("The Little Dove"), 1860
- "La Maldición" ("The Curse"), 1860
- "En el Álbum de D. F." ("In the Album of D. F."), 24 August 1861
- "En el Álbum de la Srta. Manuelita Fernández" ("In the Album of Miss Manuelita Fernández"), 24 August 1861
