= María Olimpia de Obaldía =

María Olimpia de Obaldía (9 September 1891 – 14 August 1985), was a Panamanian poet.

== Biography ==
The daughter of Manuel del Rosario Miranda and Felipa Rovira, she was born in Dolega, Chiriquí. She studied at the Escuela Normal de Institutoras in Panama City, qualified in 1913, and worked as a primary school teacher in her native town until her marriage to Don José de Obaldía in 1918.

She published her first book, Orquídeas, in 1926. In 1930, she was granted the title Maria Olimpia de Panama by the Instituto Nacional de Panamá. In 1951, she became the first female member of the Academia Panameña de la Lengua and held this post until her death in 1985. In 1976, she was made a Commander of the Panamanian Order of Vasco Núñez de Balboa and in 1983 was decorated with the Orden de Belisario Porras. The same year, she received the papal award Augusta Cruz Insigne Pro Ecclesia et Pontifice from John Paul II.

Her writings generally deal with subjects such as maternity and love of family. Her most famous poem Ñatore May, expresses the suffering of women of the Ngöbe Buglé people (an indigenous Panamanian Indian group).

== Poetry ==
- Orquídeas Panamá, Imprenta Nacional, 1926
- Breviario Lírico, Panamá, Imprenta Nacional, 1930
- Parnaso Infantil, Panamá, Ediciones del Departamento de Cultura, 1948
- Visiones eternas, Panamá, 1961
- Obra Poética Completa, Club Kiwanis de Panamá with the collaboration of Instituto Nacional de Cultura, 1976
