= Rosa María Britton =

Panamanian doctor and writer (1936–2019)

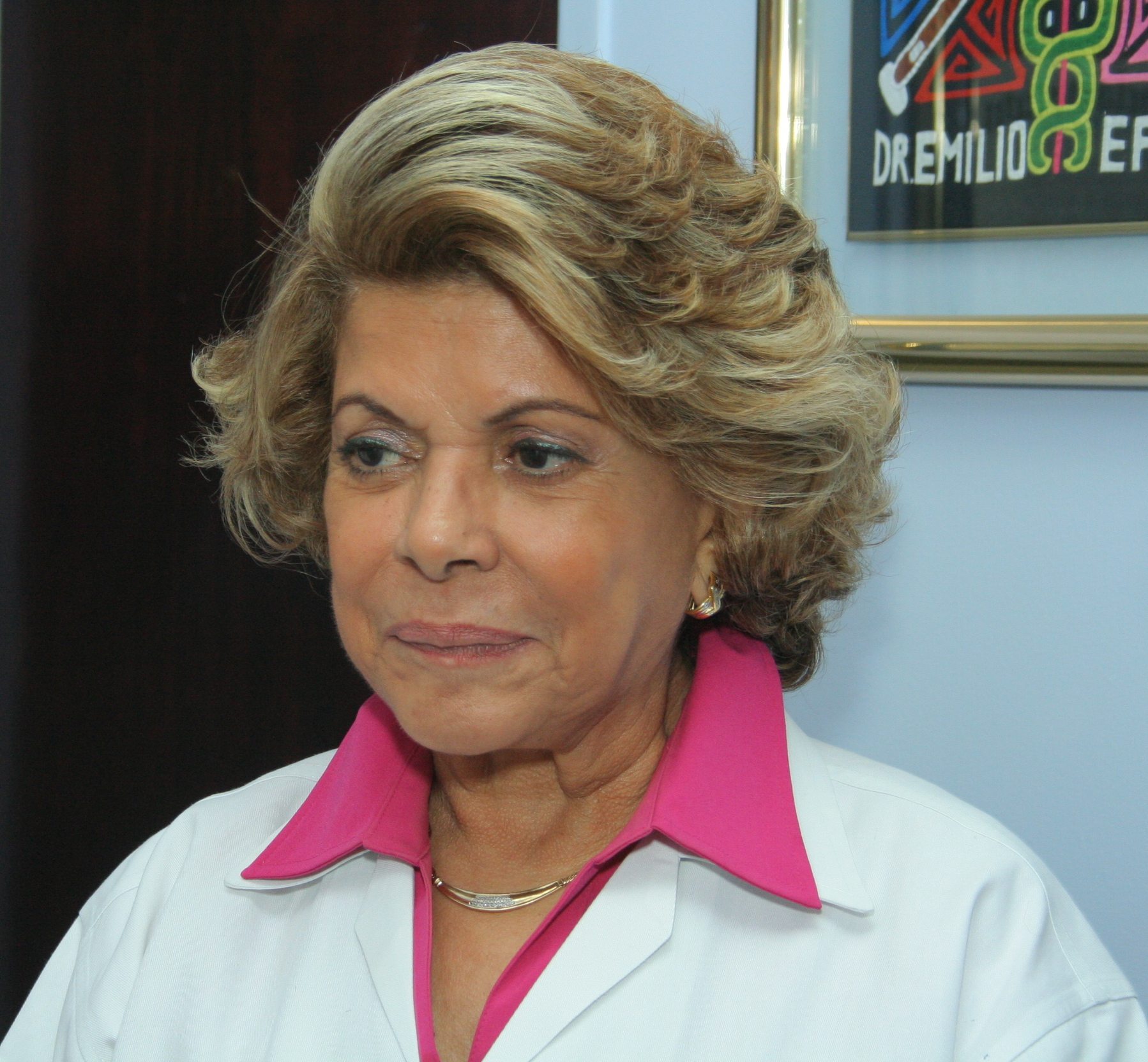
- Born: Rosa María Crespo Justiniani; 28 July 1936; Panama City, Panama
- Died: July 16, 2019 (aged 82); Panama City, Panama
- Other name: Rosa María Crespo Justiniani de Britton
- Education: Universidad de La Habana, Universidad Complutense de Madrid,
- Occupations: Writer, doctor and teacher
- Notable work: El ataúd de uso; El Señor de las lluvias y el viento
- Spouse: Carl Britton
- Children: Walter Britton, Gabrielle Britton
- Awards: Premio César Escritora del Año, Los Ángeles, California, Estados Unidos. 1985; Primer lugar en la sección de cuento del Concurso Literario Fulbright, San José, Costa Rica. 1985; Premio de Teatro en Quetzaltenango, Guatemala con la obra Los Loros no Lloran. 1995

Rosa María Britton (28 July 1936 – 16 July 2019) was a Panamanian doctor and novelist.

== Background and education ==
Rosa María Britton was a renowned Panamanian writer known for her contributions to literature and medicine. She was born on June 18, 1936 in Panama City. Her father was Cuban and her mother was Panamanian. She attended school in Panama City and her secondary studies in Havana, Cuba. She studied medicine at the University of Madrid in Spain and continued her studies in gynecology and oncology at the Brooklyn Jewish Hospital and Medical Center in the United States.

She moved to Panama in 1972.

Britton is recognized for addressing gender, health, and societal issues in her literary work. Her writings explore the realities and challenges faced by women in Panamanian and Latin American society. Through her narrative, she sought to give visibility to women's voices and experiences while promoting gender equality.

Britton specialized in gynecology and obstetrics. Her medical background and experience in the healthcare field influenced her literary work, allowing her to delve into topics related to health and the female body.

Some of Britton's most well-known works include La noche y su orilla (1987), La espiral eterna (1993), and El último vuelo del pterodáctilo (1999). Her writings have received national and international recognition, and she was awarded literary prizes for her outstanding contributions. In particular, she won the Ricardo Miró Prize six times, as well a César Award.

She was president of the National Library Foundation for over 30 years. She was an honorary member of the Panamanian Academy of Language.

Britton left a significant legacy in Panamanian and Latin American literature, creating space for reflection on gender and health issues in contemporary society.

== Works ==
=== Novels ===
- El ataúd de uso, 1983
- El señor de las lluvias y el viento, 1984
- No pertenezco a este siglo, 1991
- Todas íbamos a ser Reinas, 1997
- Laberintos de orgullo, 2002
- Suspiros de fantasmas, 2005

=== Tales ===
- ¿Quién inventó el mambo? , 1985, Panama.
- La muerte tiene dos caras, 1987, Costa Rica.
- Semana de la mujer y otras calamidades, 1995, Spain.
- La nariz invisible y otros misterios, 2001, Spain.
- Historia de Mujeres Crueles, Editorial Alfaguara, 2011, Spain. ISBN 978-9962-8968-1-4
- Tocino del Cielo (2015)

=== Theater ===
- Esa Esquina del Paraiso, 1986
- Banquete de despedida/Miss Panamá Inc., 1987
