= Gloria Guardia =

Panamanian writer (1940–2019)

Gloria Guardia (1940 – 13 May 2019) was a Panamanian novelist, essayist and journalist whose works received recognition in Latin America, Europe, Australia and Japan. She was a Fellow at the Panamanian Academy of Letters and Associate Fellow at the Spanish Royal Academy, the Colombian and the Nicaraguan Academy of Letters

== Early life and education ==
Guardia was born in 1940. She was the youngest daughter of the Panamanian Consulting Engineer Carlos A. Guardia, co-founder of AIDIS, (Inter-American Association of Sanitary and Environmental Engineering), and descendant of Sebastian de la Guardia (c. 1640), one of Panamanian Founding Fathers. Her mother, Olga Zeledon, a native of Nicaragua, was the youngest daughter of the country's national hero, Benjamin Zeledón and his wife Ester Ramirez Jerez.

In 1958, Guardia graduated from Roycemorel-School, an independent, nonsectarian college preparatory school located in Evanston, Illinois. In 1960, she studied Philosophy and literature at the Complutense University in Madrid and Spanish literature and Iberoamerica at Madrid's Instituto de Cultura Hispánica. In the United States, she received a Bachelor of Arts degree "cum laude" from Vassar College in 1962 and a Master of Arts degree from Columbia University in 1968. That year, she presented a dissertation for a Ph.D. degree on Comparative Literature: Estudio sobre el pensamiento poético de Pablo Antonio Cuadra, which was revised for publication at Editorial Gredos, Madrid.

== Career ==
=== Literary contributions ===
Her literary works include novels, essays, short stories and critical studies. She has been awarded several national and international literary awards for her works, including one from the Society of Spanish and Iberoamerican Writers in 1961, the Ricardo Miró National Prize for an essay or novel in 1966, the Central American Novel Prize in 1976, two awards (essay and short story) from the magazine Lotería in 1971, and 1996 and the National Short Story Award from the city of Bogotá, Colombia, in 1996. The jury underlined the fact that one of the reasons for selecting the book for this particular award was that it was the first postmodern short-story book ever to be published in the region. In 2000, her novel Libertad en llamas was short listed for the Sor Juana Inés de la Cruz Novel Prize in Mexico. In 2007, the Rockefeller Foundation selected her to be one of their novelist-in-residence at The Bellagio Center, where she wrote her novel El jardín de las cenizas, third part of the trilogy Maramargo. In 2014 her novel En el corazón de la noche was launched in Buenos Aires and second and third editions were launched by Penguin Random House in Bogota and Spain respectively. Her short stories appeared in Spain, the U.S., France, England, Italy, Poland and Japan.

=== International contributions ===
From 1975 to 1995, she worked as a syndicated columnist for several periodicals, including La Prensa, Panama America, and Cambio. She served as ABC News correspondent in Panama and as consultant at Canal (channel) 5 (FETV) in Panama. In 1990 she collaborated on the twenty-first edition of the Dictionary of the Spanish Royal Academy (DRAE) and the second edition of the Dictionary of Colombianismos for the Colombian Academy. She was the founder of the Panamanian chapter of the PEN-International and served as one of the seven executive council members of PEN from 1997 to 2002. Until 2004, she was a member of the Board of Trustees of the PEN International foundation. She also served as an International Vice President at PEN International.

== Personal life ==
Guardia's husband was Ricardo Alfaro, grandson of former Panamanian Presidents, Ricardo J. Alfaro and Alcibiades Arosemena. They had a daughter, Cristina Alfaro Carlis (Mrs. E. Scott Carlis) who lives with her husband and children in Los Ángeles, California and San Juan Capistrano, California. There were two grandchildren. Guardia and her husband divided their time between Bogotá, Panama City and Los Angeles.

She died in Bogota, 13 May 2019.

== Bibliography ==
- APENAS AYER (Memoires) Managua: Anema Editores, 2018.
- EN EL CORAZÓN DE LA NOCHE (Novel) Madrid: Grijalbo, Penguin Random House Grupo Editorial, 2017.
- EN EL CORAZÓN DE LA NOCHE (Novel) Bogotá: Grijalbo, Penguin Random House Grupo Editorial, 2016.
- EN EL CORAZÓN DE LA NOCHE. (Novel) Buenos Aires: Editorial Victoria Ocampo, 2014.
- EL JARDÍN DE LAS CENIZAS. (Novel) Cali: Alfaguara, 2011. Tercera Parte de la trilogía MARAMARGO.
- EL ÚLTIMO JUEGO. (Novel) San José: Alfaguara, 2009. (4a edición yprimera de Alfaguara)Primera parte de la trilogía MARAMARGO.
- ROGELIO SINÁN A LA LUZ DE LAS NUEVAS PROPUESTAS CRÍTICAS SOBRE LA NARRATIVA LATINOAMERICANA Essay) en Rogelio Sinán, Plenilunio, Sin novedad en Shanghai, Colección Clásica, N° 237, Caracas: Biblioteca Ayacucho, 2007 (Premio Nacional del Libro, CENAL, Venezuela, Categoría "Prólogo", 2007)..
- LOBOS AL ANOCHECER. (Novel) Bogotá: Alfaguara, 2006. 2ª edición, San José: Alfaguara, 2006, 3ª edición, Cali, Alfaguara, 2011. Segunda Parte de la trilogía MARAMARGO.
- PABLO ANTONIO CUADRA: POETA Y PENSADOR CRISTIANO (Essay) Cistercium, Revista Cisterciense del Centro Internacional de Estudios Místicos, abril-junio de 2004, N° 235. Catabria: Ediciones Monte Casino; y San José: PENSAR, 2007.
- LA MIRADA DE ORFEO EN DANTE Y DARÍO (Essay) en DANTE EN AMÉRICA LATINA Casino: Universitá degli Studi di Cassino, 2007; Lengua, Revista de la Academia Nicaragüense de la Lengua, 2ª época, N° 33, Managua, junio de 2008.
- ALTERACIONES DEL DARIEN: POEMA FUNDACIONAL DE UNA REALIDAD NUEVA. (Essay) Revista iberoamericana, ISSN 0034-9631, Nº. 196, 2001 (Número dedicado la literatura y cultura panameña), pags. 443-450.
- LIBERTAD EN LLAMAS (Novel) México/Barcelona: Plaza y Janés, 1999, Finalista, Premio Sor Juana Inés de la Cruz de la Feria Internacional del Libro de Guadalajara (FIL), 2000.
- ASPECTOS DE CREACIÓN EN LA NOVELA CENTROAMERICANA (Essay). Colección Encuentros. Washington, D. C. Centro Cultural del Banco Interamericano de Desarrollo, Tomo 29, septiembre de 1998. Traducción al Inglés, ASPECTS OF CREATION IN THE CENTRAL AMERICAN NOVEL. Traductora, Marguerite Feitlowitz, Washington, D. C. IDB Cultural Center, Volume 29, September, 1998.
- LA PALABRA MITOPOÉTICA EN LA OBRA DE PABLO ANTONIO CUADRA (Essay) Discurso de recepción en la Academia Colombiana de la Lengua. Bogotá: Boletín de la Academia Colombiana de la Lengua, Tomo XLVII, Número 198, octubre, noviembre, diciembre de 1997.
- LA CARTA (Nouvella). Salta: Biblioteca de Textos Universitarios, 1997. Segunda edición, Managua: Centro Nicaragüense de Escritores y Agencia para el Desarrollo (NORAD), 2000.
- CARTAS APÓCRIFAS (Short Stories) Bogotá: Tercer Mundo Editores, 1997. Premio Nacional de Cuento, Ciudad de Bogotá, 1996. Segunda edición, Bogotá: Editorial Pontificia Javeriana, 2005.
- ROGELIO SINÁN: UNA REFLEXIÓN CRÍTICA EN TORNO A LA CONTRIBUCIÓN DEL LIBRO ONDA A LA POESÍA PANAMEÑA DEL SIGLO XX (Essay). PANAMÁ: 90 AÑOS DE REPÚBLICA. Panamá: Impresora de la Nación, 1994.
- APROXIMACIÓN A LIBRE Y CAUTIVA DE STELLA SIERRA (Ensayo). Panamá: Publi-Impresos López, 1990.
- LA MUJER EN LA ACADEMIA (Essay). Discurso de recepción en la Academia Panameña de la Lengua. Panamá: Editorial Myriam Bermúdez, 1989.
- LA BÚSQUEDA DEL ROSTRO (Collected Essays). Panamá: Editorial Signos, 1984.
- EL ÚLTIMO JUEGO (Novel a) San José: Editorial Universitaria, 1977. Premio Centroamericano de Novela, EDUCA, 1976. Russian Translation: Moscow, Joven Guardia, 1981. Tercera edición, Panamá: Biblioteca de la Nacionalidad, Autoridad del Canal, 1999. Cuarta edición, San José: Alfaguara (en prensa).
- ROGELIO SINÁN: UNA REVISIÓN DE LA VANGUARDIA EN PANAMÁ (Essay). Panamá: Litho-Impresora Panamá, S.A. 1975.
- CON ERNESTO CARDENAL (testimonio con fotografías de Sandra Eleta) Panamá: Editora Litográfica, 1974. AQUELLOS AÑOS DE SOLENTINAME. Managua: Ediciones Centroamericanas ANAMÁ, 2000.
- ESTUDIO SOBRE EL PENSAMIENTO POÉTICO DE PABLO ANTONIO CUADRA (Dissertation). Madrid: Editorial Gredos, 1971.
- EL TRÍPTICO TEMÁTICO EN LA POESÍA DE MIGUEL HERNÁNDEZ. Essay) Humboldt, (Hamburgo) N° XXI, año VIII, 1967.
- POR QUÉ FRACASÓ EL TEATRO DE UNAMUNO. Humboldt (Hamburgo) N° XX, año V, 1964.
- TINIEBLA BLANCA (Novel). Madrid: Editorial Clásica y Moderna. Medalla de oro de la Sociedad de Escritores Españoles e Iberoamericanos, 1961.
- [editar] AntologíasAndradi, Esther, edit. COMER CON LA MIRADA. Gloria Guardia, "Cena criolla". Buenos Aires: Ediciones Desde la Gente, 2008 .
- Menton, Seymour: EL CUENTO HISPANOAMERICANO, Gloria Guardia, "Recado desde Estocolmo". México: Fondo de Cultura Económica, 2003.
- Rincón, Carlos y Sarah de Mojica, editores. LECTORES Y AUTORES DEL QUIJOTE! 2 tomos, Gloria Guardia, Sobre las mil zarandajas que... Bogotá: Editorial Pontificia Javeriana, 2005.
- Suárez, Mercedes, edit. LA AMÉRICA REAL Y LA AMÉRICA MÁGICA A TRAVÉS DE SU LITERATURA, Segunda Edición aumentada. Fragmento de EL ULTIMO JUEGO, Salamanca: Ediciones de la Universidad de Salamanca, 2004; LETRAS Y ARTE DE NUESTRA AMÉRICA: Bogotá/Madrid: Convenio Andrés Bello & Villegas Editores, 2004.

=== Anthologies ===
- Andradi, Esther, edit. COMER CON LA MIRADA. Gloria Guardia, Cena criolla. Buenos Aires: Ediciones Desde la Gente, 2008.
- Bareiro, Saguier, Rubén, ANTOLOGÍA DEL CUENTO LATINOAMERICANO, VOL. 4, MONTEVIDEO, 2008.
- De León, Oliver Gilberto, LITERATURAS IBÉRICAS (French Editions= Francia: Editions Ophrys, 1984, 2014.
- Giraldo, Luz Mary, Selección y Prólogo. CUENTAN. Gloria Guardia, Isak Dinisen: La venganza de la verdad. Medellín: Sílaba Editores, 2010. Premio "Montserrat Ordóñez" 2012, Latin American Studies Association (LASA).
- Hillar, Anna, PhD, editor and translator. GREAT SPANISH AND LATIN ) AMERICAN SHORT STORIES OF THE 20TH CENTURY, GRANDES CUENTOS ESPAÑOLES Y LATINOAMERICANOS DEL SIGLO XX. A Dual Languages Book. Gloria Guardia, "Otra vez Bach", "Once Again Bach", New York: Dover Publications, 2013.
- Menton, Seymour: EL CUENTO HISPANOAMERICANO, Gloria Guardia, Recado desde Estocolmo. México: Fondo de Cultura Económica, 2003.
- Muñoz, Willy, editor. Antología de cuentistas centroamericanas, Gloria a Guardia, Otra vez Bach., 2005.
- Palma, Milagros, editeur, Milagros Esguerra, préface: ECRITURES DE FEMMES D'AMERIQUE LATINE EN FRANCE. ESCRITURAS DE MUJER DE AMÉRICA LATINA EN FRANCIA. Paris; Índigo & Cote Femmes Editions, 1986.
- Rincón, Carlos y Sarah de Mojica, editores. LECTORES Y AUTORES DEL QUIJOTE! 2 tomos, Gloria Guardia, " Sobre las mil zarandajas que..." Bogotá: Editorial Pontificia Javeriana, 2005.
- Suárez, Mercedes, edit. LA AMÉRICA REAL Y LA AMÉRICA MÁGICA A TRAVÉS DE SU LITERATURA, Segunda Edición aumentada. Fragmento de EL ÚLTIMO JUEGO, Salamanca: Ediciones de la Universidad de Salamanca, 2004; LETRAS Y ARTE DE NUESTRA AMÉRICA: Bogotá/Madrid: Convenio Andrés Bello & Villegas Editores, 2004.

== Awards and honours ==
- Honor Scholarship, Vassar College, Poughkeepsie, New York, 1958–61, 1962–63
- Medalla de oro de la Sociedad de Escritores Españoles e Iberoamericanos, Madrid, 1961.
- B.A. (Bachelor of Arts, "Cum Laude") Vassar College, 1963.
- Honor Fellowship, Organization of American States (OAS) to attend Graduate School, Columbia University, City of New York 1965–1968.
- National Book Award, Essay, "Ricardo Miró", Panamá, 1966.
- National Book Award, Novel, "RIcardo Miró, Panamá, 1966.
- Central American Book Award (EDUCA), San José, 1977.
- Fellow, Academia Panameña de la Lengua, Panamá, 1985.
- Associate Fellow, Spanish Royal Academy, Madrid, 1989.
- National Short Story Award, Ciudad de Bogotá", Colombia, Colombia, 1997.
- Associate Fellow, Colombian Academy of Letters, Bogota, 1997.
- Keys of The City of Miami, EE.UU, 1997.
- Nicaragua's Most Distinguished Citizen, Orden Rubén Darío, Nicaragua, 2000.
- International Who's Who's of Women, 2002.
- Front Runner Sor Juana Inés de la Cruz's Book Award, Feria Internacional del Libro (FIL), de Guadalajara, México, 1999.
- List of Vassar College People, Famous Alumni, Writers, 2003.
- International Vice President, PEN International, London, 2006.
- Associate Fellow, Nicaragua's Academy of Letters, Managua, Nicaragua, 2007.
- Fellow, Rockefeller Foundation, Bellagio Center, 2007.
- National Book Award (Essay), (CENAL), Venezuela, 2007.
- Continental Who's Who's, 2014.
- Bristol Who's Who, 2015.
- Columbia University's Who's Who of Distinguished Alumni, 2015.
