= Darío Herrera (poet) =

- Born: July 18, 1870 Panama City, United States of Colombia
- Died: June 10, 1914 (aged 43) Valparaíso, Chile
- Occupation: Writer & diplomat
- Genre: Poetry, short story
- Literary movement: Modernismo

Darío Herrera (1870-1914) was a Panamanian Modernismo poet and diplomat. He placed great importance on the example given by contemporary French writing. His most important work is Horas lejanas y otros cuentos, a collection of short stories (published Buenos Aires 1903)
