= Consuelo Tomás =

Panamanian actress

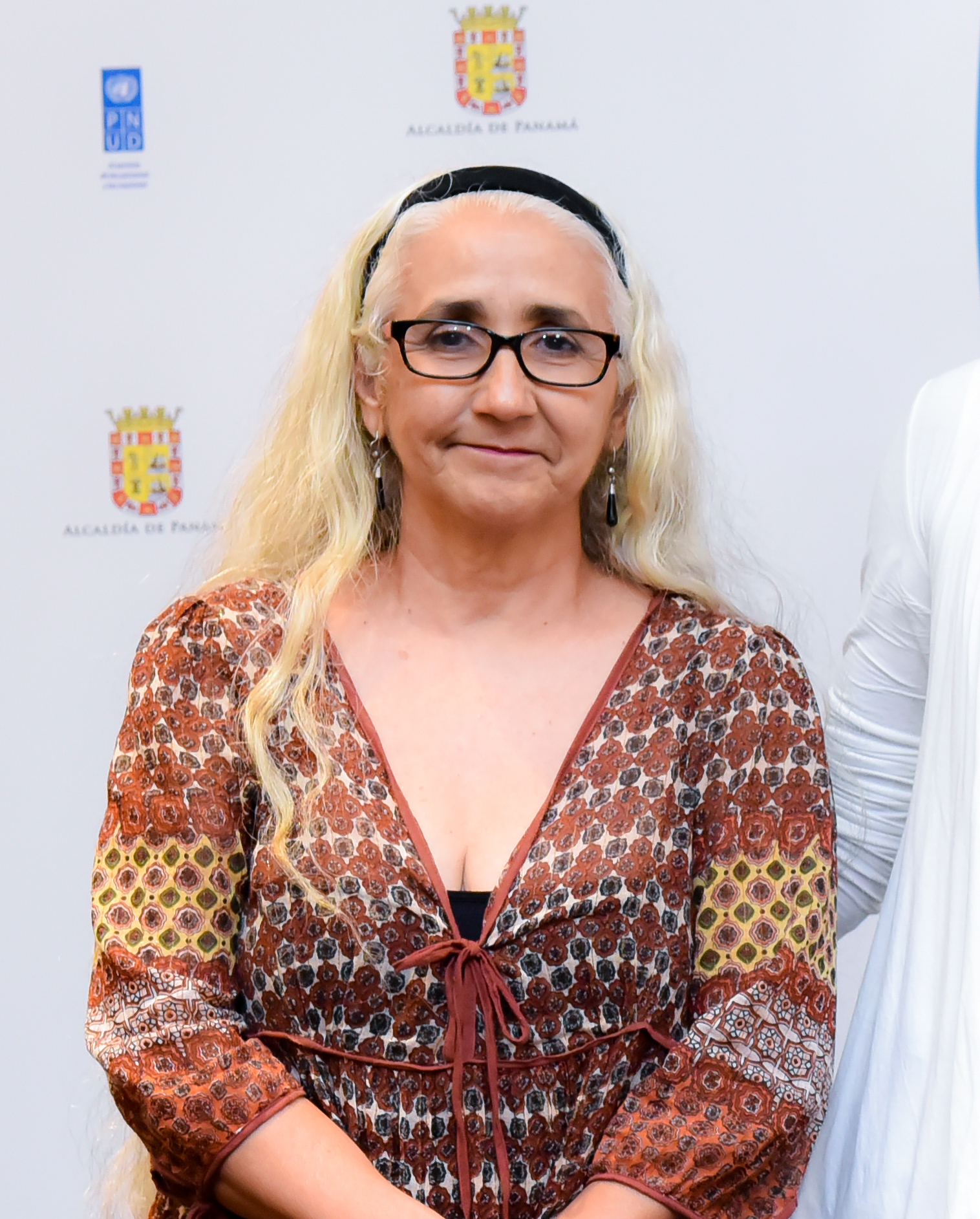
- Consuelo Tomás in 2018.
- Born: Bocas del Toro, Panama
- Occupations: puppeteer, playwright, poet, novelist
- Writing career
- Genres: Fiction, Short stories, Poetry

Consuelo Tomás Fitzgerald (born 1957 in Bocas del Toro) is a Panamanian actress in puppet shows, playwright, poet, novelist and radio and television co-ordinator.

She is a producer and editor-in-chief of the radio station Crisol FM and the Panamanian Radio and Television State Broadcasting (Sistema Estatal de Radio y Televisión, SERTV). She is also a member of the Cultural Association AlterArte and the Executive Committee in Projects for Drama Training in Central America (Carromato).

== Works ==
- Confieso estas Ternuras y estas rabias (Poetry, Formato 16, 1983)
- Las preguntas indeseables (Poetry, Ed. Formato 16, 1985)
- Cuentos Rotos (Short Stories, Ed. Mariano Arosemena, 1991)
- Motivos Generales (Poetry, Ed. Buho, República Dominicana, 1992)
- Apelaciones (Poetry, Col. Antologías y Homenajes, Ed. Mariano Arosemena, 1993)
- El Cuarto Edén (Poetry, Epic Publications, 1985)
- Inauguración de la Fe (Novel, Col. Premio, Ed. Mariano Arosemena, 1995)
- Agonía de la Reina (Poetry, Col. Premio, Ed. Mariano Arosemena, 1995)
- Libro de las Propensiones (Poetry, 2000)
- Evangelio según San Borges (Theatre, Ed. Mariano Arosemena, 2005)
- Pa'na'má Quererte (Short Stories, 2007)
- Lágrima de dragón (Novel, 2010)

== Prizes ==
- First Working Literature Competition Award, 1979
- Literature Award «Ricardo Miró», 1994
