= Ricardo Miró =

Panamanian writer (1882–1940)

Ricardo Miró Denis
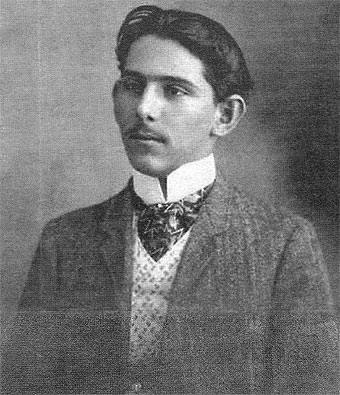
- Born: November 5, 1883; Panama City, Panama State, United States of Colombia
- Died: March 2, 1940 (aged 56); Panama City, Panama
- Occupation: Poet
- Writing career
- Movement: Modernism

Ricardo Miró Denis (November 5, 1883 in Panama City, Panama – March 2, 1940) was a Panamanian writer and is considered Panama's national poet.

He traveled to Bogotá at the age of fifteen to study painting, but was forced to return to Panama in 1899 due to the Thousand Days' War. His first verses were published by the magazine Isthmus Herald, where he worked for 10 years.

Miró traveled to Spain between 1908 and 1911, where he had the position of consul in Barcelona. In 1909, his poem "Patria" (Native Land) was published. His work was characterized as being nostalgic and filled with the author's thoughts about living away from his own native land. In 1917, he returned to Panama to serve as director of the National Archives until 1927 and as a secretary for the Academia Panameña de la Lengua until 1940.

He died on March 2, 1940, in Panama City.

== Youth ==
Ricardo Miró Denis was born on 5 November 1883 in Panama City, then a part of the United States of Colombia. He was the son of Ricardo Miró Tuñón and his wife, Mercedes Denis. His paternal grandfather was Gregorio Miró Arosemena, a former governor of Panama between 1873 and 1875.

== Legacy ==
A posthumous annual literary prize was named in his honour, the Ricardo Miró National Literary Contest of the Republic of Panama. The prize was to encourage writers of poetry and fiction in Panama and in 1952 was extended to include works for theater.

In celebration of 100 years since his birth, Miró's completed works were published in two volumes by the National Institute of Culture of Panama.

== Personal life ==
Miró's daughter, Carmen A. Miró, became a noted demographer. In Season 11 of Finding Your Roots, a DNA test revealed that musician and actor Rubén Blades is Miró's grandson. Miró is also the grandfather of Rubén Blades' brother, Grammy Award-winning salsa musician Roberto Blades.

== Selected bibliography ==
=== Novels and collections ===
- Preludes (1908)
- Second Preludes (1916)
- The Pacific legend (1919)
- Maria Flower (1922)
- Patriotic verses and scholastic recitals (1925)
- Silent Ways (1929)
- Poetry (collection published 1983)
- Novels and Stories (collection published 1983)

=== Poems ===
- "The Last Seagull" (1905)
- "Native Land" (1909)
- "To Portobello" (1918)
- "Patria" ("Homeland")
- The reincarnation poem (1929)
