= Economy of Panama =

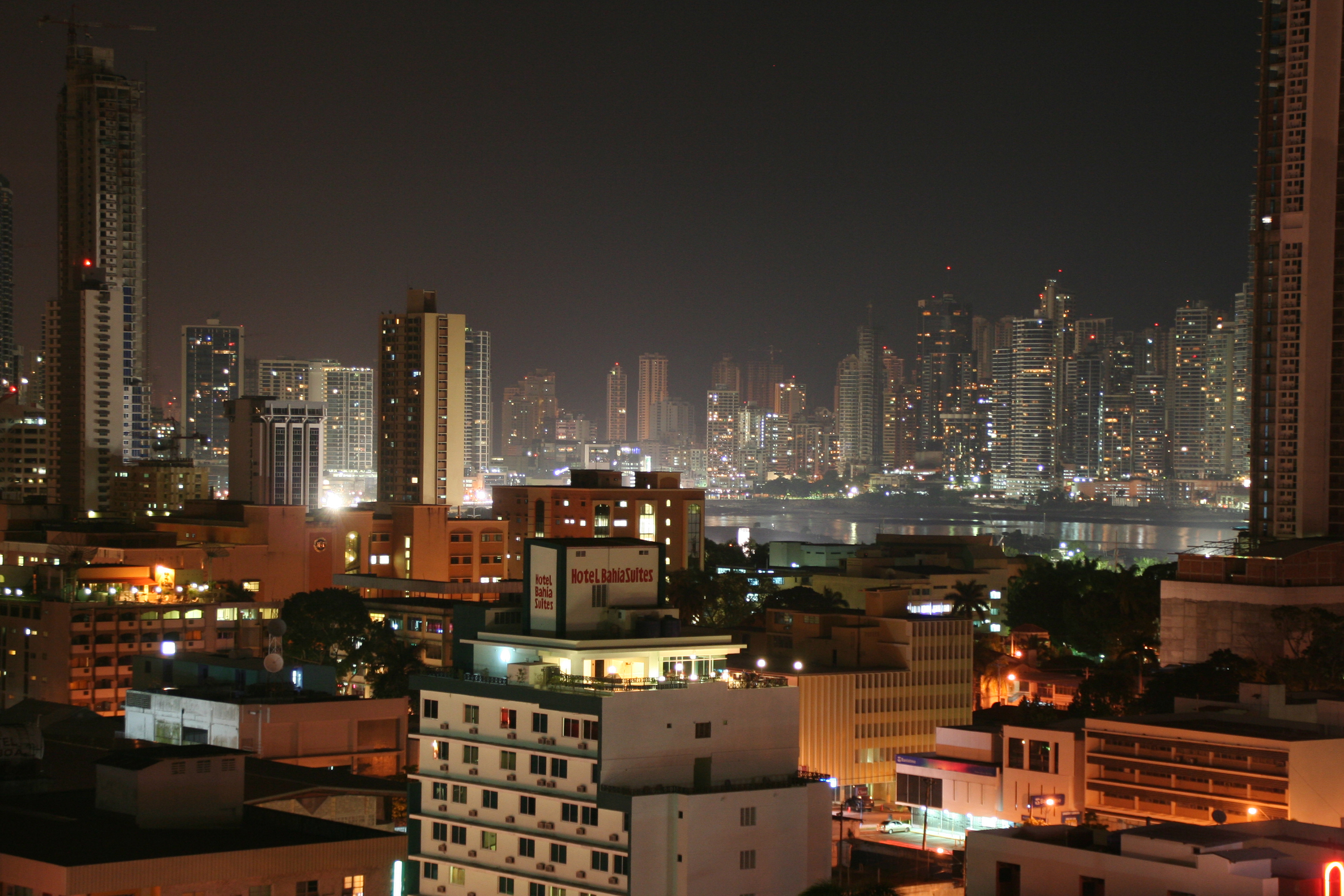
- Panama City is the capital and financial center of Panama
- Currency: Panamanian balboa (PAB, B/.); U.S. Dollar (USD, $)
- Fixed exchange rates: 1 PAB = 1 USD
- Fiscal year: Calendar year
- Trade organizations: WTO, SICA
- Country group: Developing/Emerging; High-income economy

Statistics
- Population: ▲4,176,873 (2018)
- GDP: ▲$95.02 billion (nominal, 2026); ▲$214.43 billion (PPP, 2026)
- GDP rank: 81st (nominal, 2026); 80th (PPP, 2026)
- GDP growth: 3.8% (2026)
- GDP per capita: ▲$20,564 (nominal, 2026); ▲$46,405 (PPP, 2026)
- GDP per capita rank: 58th (nominal, 2026); 52nd (PPP, 2026)
- GDP per capita growth: 1.5% (2024)
- GDP by sector: agriculture: 2.4%; industry: 15.7%; services: 82%; (2017 est.)
- Inflation (CPI): -0.19% (2024)
- Population below national poverty line: ▼13.4% (2023)
- Gini coefficient: ▼48.9 high (2023)
- Human Development Index: ▲0.839 very high (2023) (59th); ▲0.664 medium (70th) IHDI (2023)
- Labor force: ▲2,063,132 (2019); ▲61.5% employment rate (2018); shortage of skilled labor, but an oversupply of unskilled labor
- Labor force by occupation: agriculture: 17%; industry: 18.6%; services: 64.4% (2009 est.)
- Unemployment: ▲6% (2017 est.)
- Main industries: construction, brewing, cement and other construction materials, sugar milling

External
- Exports: ▲$15.5 billion (2017 est.); includes the Colón Free Zone
- Export goods: fruit and nuts, fish, iron and steel waste, wood
- Main export partners: United States 18.9%; Netherlands 16.6%; China 6.5%; Costa Rica 5.4%; India 5.1%; Vietnam 5%; (2017)
- Imports: ▲$21.91 billion (2017 est.); includes the Colón Free Zone
- Import goods: fuels, machinery, vehicles, iron and steel rods, pharmaceuticals
- Main import partners: United States 24.4%; China 9.8%; Mexico 4.9%; (2017)
- FDI stock: ▲$56.7 billion (31 December 2017 est.); ▲ Abroad: $11.38 billion (31 December 2017 est.)
- Current account: ▲ −$3.036 billion (2017 est.)
- Gross external debt: ▲$91.53 billion (31 December 2017 est.)

Public finance
- Government debt: ▲37.8% of GDP (2017 est.)
- Foreign reserves: ▼$2.703 billion (31 December 2017 est.)
- Budget balance: −1.6% (of GDP) (2017 est.)
- Revenue: 12.43 billion (2017 est.)
- Spending: 13.44 billion (2017 est.)
- Credit rating: Standard & Poor's: BBB (Domestic); BBB (Foreign); AAA (T&C Assessment); Outlook: Stable; Moody's: Baa2; Outlook: Stable; Fitch: BBB; Outlook: Positive
- All values, unless otherwise stated, are in US dollars.

The economy of Panama is based mainly on the tourism and services sector, which accounts for nearly 80% of its GDP and accounts for most of its foreign income. Services include banking, commerce, insurance, container ports, and flagship registry, medical and health and tourism. Historically, the Panama Canal (and the nearby Colón Free Trade Zone) was the key source of Panama's income, but its importance has been displaced by the services sector. As of 2025 Panama had a GDP of 90.41 billion USD. This equated to 19,800 USD per capita. In 2025, Panama also had an unemployment rate of 8%. Panama has a gross national debt of 59.6% of GDP. In 2024, Panama exported 37.37 billion USD worth of exports, an increase from 35.71 billion USD in 2022.

The country's industry includes the manufacturing of aircraft spare parts, cement and ceramics, drinks, adhesives, and textiles. Additionally, exports from Panama include bananas, shrimp, sugar, coffee, and clothing. Panama's economy is fully dollarized, with the US dollar being legal tender in the country. Panama was the first foreign country to adopt the U.S. dollar as its legal currency (1903) after its secession from Colombia (with U.S. help) temporarily deprived it of a local currency. Panama is a high income economy with a history of low inflation.

== Economic history ==
Since the early 16th century, Panama's geographic location gave the country a comparative advantage. From the earliest Spanish times, ports on each coast and a trail between them handled much of Spain's colonial trade to the benefit of the inhabitants of the port cities.

Panama has always been dependent on world commerce for its prosperity, and it is affected by the cyclical nature of international trade. The economy stagnated in the 18th century as colonial exchange via the isthmus declined. In the mid-19th century, Panama's economy boomed as a result of increased cargo and passengers associated with the California Gold Rush. A railroad across the isthmus, completed in 1855, extended economic growth for about fifteen years until completion of the first transcontinental railroad in the United States led to a decline in trans-isthmian traffic.

France's efforts to construct a canal across the isthmus in the 1880s and efforts by the United States in the early 20th century stimulated the Panamanian economy. The United States completed the canal in 1914. However, the world depression of the 1930s reduced international trade and canal traffic, causing widespread unemployment in the terminal cities and generating a flow of workers to subsistence farming. During World War II, canal traffic did not increase, but the economy boomed as the convoy system and the presence of United States forces, sent to defend the canal, increased foreign spending in the canal cities. The end of the war was followed by an economic depression and another movement of unemployed people into agriculture.

The postwar depression gave way to rapid economic expansion between 1950 and 1970. All sectors contributed to the growth. Agricultural output rose, and commerce evolved into a relatively sophisticated wholesale and retail system. Banking, tourism, and the export of services to the Canal Zone grew rapidly. Most importantly, an increase in world trade provided a major stimulus to use of the canal and to the economy.

In the 1970s and 1980s, Panama's growth fluctuated with the vagaries of the world economy. After 1973, economic expansion slowed considerably as a result of a number of international and domestic factors. In the early 1980s, the economy rebounded. The acute recession in Latin America after 1982, however, wreaked havoc on Panama's economy. This period coincided with the rise to power of General Manuel Noriega during which Panama became increasingly indebted.

The United States started to pursue Noriega, culminating in sanctions that froze Panama's assets in the United States, and because Panama used the US dollar it was forced to default on its IMF debt in 1987. Economic turmoil in the country included a general strike and the banking system closing down for two months. The United States invaded Panama in 1989 and forced the surrender of Noriega. Panama regained access to IMF funds in 1992.

After taking office in 1994, President Ernesto Perez Balladares instituted an economic liberalization program designed to liberalize the trade regime, attract foreign investment, privatize state-owned enterprises, institute fiscal discipline. After two years of near-stagnation, there was strong GDP growth in 1997–1998. The most important sectors which drove growth were the Panama Canal and the shipping and port activities of the Colón Free Trade Zone.

During the Moscoso administration beginning in 1999, Moscoso attempted to strengthen social programs. Moscoso's administration successfully handled the Panama Canal transfer and was effective in the administration of the Canal.

Under the Martín Torrijos administration beginning in 2004, Panama continued strong economic growth and initiated the 2007–2016 Panama Canal expansion project. The canal expansion doubled the waterway capacity. Strong economic performance had reduced the national poverty level to 29% in 2008.

In 2008, Panama had the second most unequal income distribution in Latin America. The Torrijos government implemented tax reforms, as well as social security reforms, and backed regional trade agreements and development of tourism. Not a CAFTA signatory, Panama in December 2006 independently negotiated a free trade agreement with the US.

In May 2009, Ricardo Martinelli was elected president, and promised to promote free trade, establish a metro system in Panama City, and complete the expansion plan for the Panama Canal.

Panama's economic role has been compared to that of Singapore: commentators have described the country as "the Singapore of Central America", although Panama's involvement in the Odebrecht scandal has dealt a blow to official attempts to market Panama using this expression.

== Infrastructure ==
=== Transportation ===
In Panama City there are six highways: the Panama-Arraijan Bridge of the Americas, Panama-Arraijan Centennial Bridge, Arraijan-Chorrera, Corredor Norte, Corredor Sur, and Autopista Panama-Colon.

Panama's roads, traffic and transportation systems are generally safe, with older traffic lights having undergone a recent overhaul and most have been replaced by traffic lights that are capable of being controlled [and changed] remotely, even at busy intersections where they are not needed. Driving during the midday is usually slow and demanding due to dense traffic, frequent traffic jams, and street renovation programs. On roads where poor lighting and driving conditions prevail, night driving is difficult and in many cases, restricted by local authorities, this usually occurs in informal settlements. Night driving is particularly hazardous in these areas. Traffic in Panama moves on the right, and Panamanian law requires that drivers and passengers wear seat belts.

Currently, Panama used to have an extensive and efficient, yet confusing to tourists, form of public transportation consisting of colorful painted buses colloquially known as Diablos Rojos. A diablo rojo is usually "customized" or painted with bright colors, usually depicting famous actors, politicians or singers. It is now popular all over the city (and also in neighboring towns) for bus drivers to personally customize the interior and exterior of their diablo rojo. Panama City's streets experience frequent traffic jams due to poor planning.

Diablos Rojos are not allowed to operate in Panama City since 2010, except for recreational purposes. The Metrobus and the Metro are the only available public transportation methods.

=== Water supply and sanitation ===
Water supply and sanitation in Panama is characterized by relatively high levels of access compared to other Latin American countries. However, challenges remain, especially in rural areas. Panama has a tropical climate and receives abundant rainfall (up to 3000mm per year), yet the country still suffers from limited water access and pollution. Intense El Niño periods, periodic droughts, reduce water availability. Multiple factors like urbanization, impacts of climate change, and economic development have decreased water resources. The high frequency of floods in recent years and the lack of corresponding measures resulted in tension among the local population. Rapid population growth in recent decades led to an unprecedented increase in freshwater demand. Regional inequality exists in water resources and water governance. An estimated 7.5-31% of Panama's population lives in isolated rural areas with minimal access to potable water and few sewage treatment facilities.

Given the large quantities of rainfall, rainwater harvesting has been implemented as a solution to increase water access. Still, the rainwater is subject to pick up any substances on the rooftops that it runs over before entering a collection tank. Water quality tests revealed that the collected water often contains coliforms or fecal coliforms, likely from running through animal droppings on roofs.

The Bocas del Toro province gets its water from a body of water named Big Creek. Although the water goes through a purification process, the treatment infrastructure was built to accommodate a much lower water demand than what is currently expected of it. Waterborne diseases are still a prominent problem for Bocas del Toro, with diarrhea, intestinal problems, and parasitosis being the leading causes for infant mortality in the province.

=== Telecommunications ===
Telecommunications in Panama includes radio, television, fixed and mobile telephones, and the Internet.

== Economic sectors ==
=== Agriculture ===
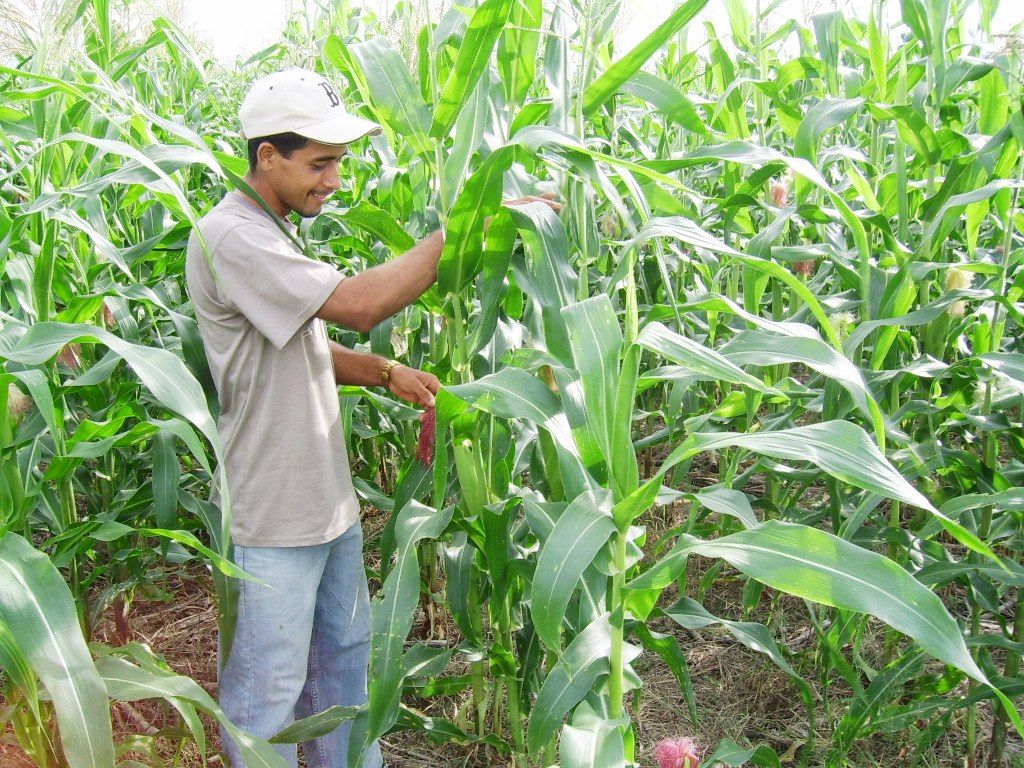
Maize cultivation in Panama.

Agriculture in Panama is an important sector of the Panamanian economy. Major agricultural products include bananas, cocoa beans, coffee, coconuts, timber, beef, chicken, shrimp, corn, potatoes, rice, soybeans, and sugar cane.

In 2009 agriculture and fisheries made up 7.4% of Panama's GDP. Panama is a net food importer and the U.S. is its main supplier. Agriculture employs many Panamanians (in relation to agriculture's percentage of Panamanian GDP) because many farmers are engaged in subsistence farming.

=== Mining ===
The mineral-mining industry of Panama accounted for about 1% of the country's GDP in 2006. This does not include any manufacturing of mineral commodities, such as cement or petroleum refinery products.

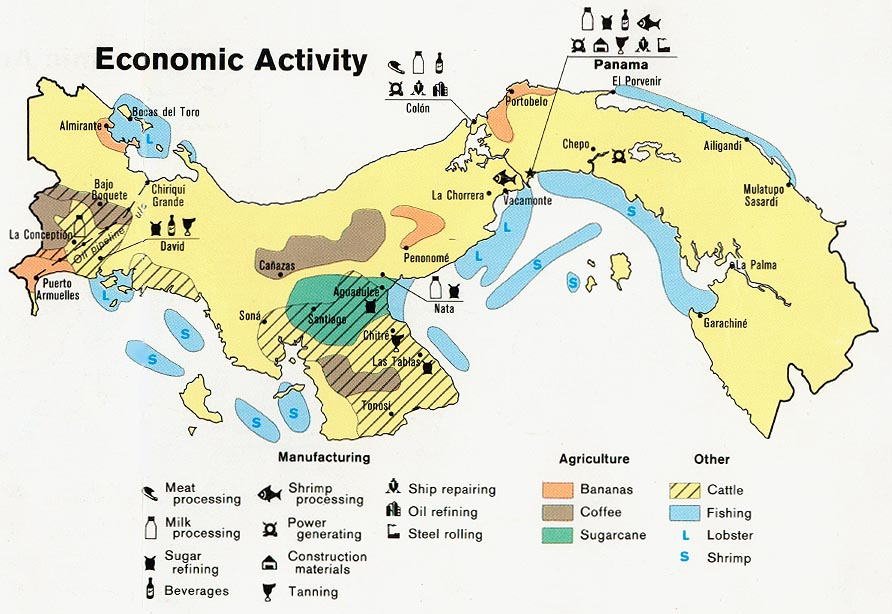
An economic activity map of Panama, 1981.

=== Financial services ===
Panama has a substantial financial services sector and no central bank to act as a lender of last resort to rescue banks that get in trouble. As a result, Panamanian banks are very conservatively run, with an average capital adequacy ratio of 15.6% in 2012, nearly double the legal minimum. The sector grew up providing trade finance for trade passing through the Canal, and later evolved into money laundering for the drug trade under Noriega. Since the 2008 financial crisis, the country has been trying to shake off its reputation as a tax haven, signing double taxation treaties with many (mostly OECD) countries and in April 2011 a treaty on the exchange of financial information with the United States.

=== Real estate ===
The Republic of Panama's real estate industry relies on foreign investment. The sector has grown since 2006, as such investment has helped to fuel Panama's economy and housing market.

In spite of the economic and housing market growth, poverty is a problem in Panama. Most indigenous people live in extreme poverty while others located in rural areas live in basic poverty. Lack of sanitation, electricity, basic water, health, and education amongst the poor is a serious problem affecting Panama’s housing conditions.

In an attempt to encourage foreign investments for real estate projects and infrastructure, the government of Panama enacted laws protecting foreigners and citizens who make investments.

Corruption permeates the real estate market including claims of drug profits and money laundering financing real estate projects.

Similar to the U.S. and Canada, Panama uses a system of publicly recorded titled deeds as proof of real estate ownership. A unique Rights of Possession system exists allowing individuals to occupy unused government lands in order to make improvements to them.

=== Education ===
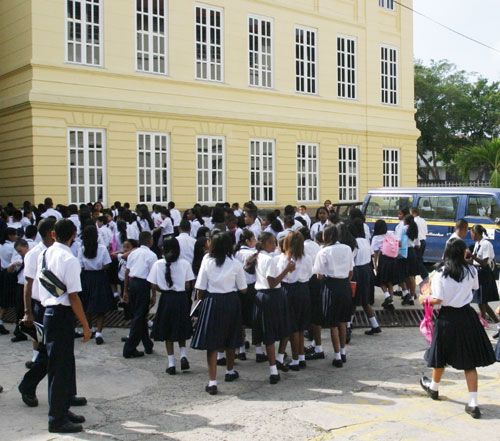
School children

Education in Panama is compulsory for the first six years of primary education and the first three years of secondary school. However, a high proportion of students complete an additional 3 years in secondary school, for a total of 6 years in secondary school. As of the 2004/2005 school year there were about 430,000 students enrolled in grades one through six (95% attendance). The total enrollment in the six secondary grades for the same period was 253,900 (60% attendance). More than 91% of Panamanians are literate.

As of 2004, more than 92,500 Panamanian students attended the University of Panama, the Technological University of Panama, West Coast University – Panama, Polytechnic University of Central America and the University of Santa Maria La Antigua, a private Catholic institution. Including smaller colleges, there are 88 institutions of higher education in Panama.

=== Healthcare ===
Ciudad de la Salud (City of Health), a four hospital complex in Ancón

Health care in Panama is provided through the government and private sector businesses. The public sector is funded through the Ministry of Health (MINSA), and the Social Security Fund (CSS), which operate separate facilities. The CSS is both a healthcare provider and a pension fund administrator. It is funded by contributions from employers and employees. About 3.47 million people of the population of roughly 3.9 million were covered by its provisions in 2013, this included both the contributors and their dependents. MINSA provides low-cost facilities for those not covered. In 2014 it operated 830 health facilities.

Rural areas can face problems with the public health care system, where a lack of funding creates a shortage of beds. The majority of doctors prefer to live in Panama City where there are higher patient loads and more economic opportunities. Panama City and David have become medical tourism destinations, especially for aesthetic and orthopaedic procedures.

=== Tourism ===
Tourism in Panama represents one of Panama‘s main activities. The main areas of tourism in the country focus on business tourism, beaches, health and trade. Most of the tourists come from the United States, Canada, Europe, Central America, and South America. Tourism generates profits of approximately US$1,400 million annually. This figure has increased rapidly since the millionth tourist arrived in 2004. There were 2 million tourists in 2011.

Tourist arrivals of 2024 in %

About 1.5 million tourists entered Panama in 2013 via the airport of Tocumen. In Panama a tourist, on average, spends US$365–385per day, the highest per capita tourist spending in Central America, while the average tourist in Panama stays for between 6 and 7 days.

In 2011, Panama was visited by more than 2 million tourists, an increase of 18% compared to 2010. The New York Times Magazine placed Panama as the best place to visit in 2012 as the country's economy was working well, with Panama having regained the control of the Canal 12 years previously. For the daily the hallmark of the country is the inter-oceanic way and its extension, which must end in 2014, with an investment of billions of dollars.

The Waldorf Astoria Panama, the first Waldorf Astoria hotel in Latin America, opened in March 2013. The Trump Ocean Club, opened in 2010 and is now JW Marriott Panama. The BioMuseo, a center of natural history, opened in October 2014. The old part of the city, Panamá Viejo, has been a UNESCO World Heritage Site since 1997. The archipelago of Bocas del Toro, is popular with backpackers.

== Taxation ==
Taxation in Panama, which is governed by the Fiscal Code, is on a territorial basis; this is to say, that taxes apply only to income or gains derived through business carried on in Panama itself. The existence of a sales or administration office in Panama, or the re-invoicing of external transactions at a profit, does not of itself give rise to taxation if the underlying transactions take place outside Panama. Dividends paid out of such earnings are free of taxation.

In February 2005, Panama's unicameral legislature approved a major fiscal reform package in order to raise revenues from new business taxes, and increases the country's level of debt. The legislature voted 46 to 28 in favour of the measures, which include a new 1.4% tax on companies’ gross revenues, and a 1% levy on firms operating in the Colón Free Trade Zone – the largest free port in the Americas.

=== Further reforms ===
President Ricardo Martinelli had promised to implement a flat tax system with a flat tax of 10% and which promised to raise revenues, put inflation under control and which will allow enormous real wage gains. Instead the Martinelli government increased sales tax to 7% from 5%, as well as increasing other taxes, in order to finance many infrastructure projects around the country.

The current VAT rates are: 7% (standard rate); 15% (tobacco); 10% (alcohol and hotels); 5% (essential goods). The corporate tax rate is 25%, while the highest marginal income tax rate is 27%.

=== As tax haven ===
The Republic of Panama is one of the oldest and best-known tax havens in the Caribbean, as well as one of the most established in the region. Panama has had a reputation for tax avoidance since the early 20th century, and Panama has been cited repeatedly in recent years as a jurisdiction which does not cooperate with international tax transparency initiatives.

Panama's offshore sector is intimately tied to the Panama Canal, which has made it a gateway and entrepôt for international trade. There are strong similarities between Panama and other leading tax havens like Hong Kong, Singapore and Dubai. On paper at least, Panama has the largest shipping fleet in the world, greater than those of the US and China combined, according to the Tax Justice Network.

== Statistics ==
Exports of Panama by product category (2019) Chemical products Transportation Machines Mineral products Plastics and rubbers Metals Foodstuffs Precious metals Textiles Instruments Animal products Vegetable products Paper goods Footwear and headwear Miscellaneous Stone and glass Wood products Animal and vegetable bi-products Animal hides Arts and antiques Weapons

The following table shows the main economic indicators in 1980–2019 (with IMF staff estimates in 2020–2026). Inflation below 5% is in green.

Year	GDP (in Bil. US$PPP)	GDP per capita (in US$ PPP)	GDP (in Bil. US$nominal)	GDP per capita (in US$ nominal)	GDP growth (real)	Inflation rate (in Percent)	Unemployment (in Percent)	Government debt (in % of GDP)
1980	7.0	3,530.8	4.1	2,071.0	▲4.5%	▲13.8%	8.4%	n/a
1981	▲8.4	▲4,120.3	▲4.6	▲2,288.4	▲9.2%	▲7.3%	▲9.2%	n/a
1982	▲9.4	▲4,501.2	▲5.1	▲2,469.1	▲5.3%	▲4.3%	▲11.0%	n/a
1983	▼9.3	▼4,365.3	▲5.3	▲2,477.1	▼-4.5%	▲2.1%	▲11.6%	n/a
1984	▲9.9	▲4,540.9	▲5.5	▲2,527.5	▲2.7%	▲1.6%	▲12.2%	n/a
1985	▲10.7	▲4,807.3	▲5.8	▲2,614.8	▲4.9%	▲1.0%	▲14.4%	n/a
1986	▲11.3	▲4,969.0	▲6.0	▲2,658.3	▲3.6%	▲-0.1%	▼12.5%	n/a
1987	▲11.4	▼4,893.2	▲6.1	▼2,613.1	▼-1.8%	▲1.0%	▲14.1%	n/a
1988	▼10.2	▼4,295.8	▼5.3	▼2,211.7	▼-13.4%	▲0.4%	▲18.8%	n/a
1989	▲10.8	▲4,440.3	5.3	▼2,171.7	▲1.6%	▲0.1%	▲18.9%	n/a
1990	▲12.1	▲4,878.5	▲5.7	▲2,313.0	▲8.1%	▲0.8%	▼16.7%	n/a
1991	▲13.7	▲5,402.2	▲6.3	▲2,489.7	▲9.4%	▲1.5%	▼16.0%	n/a
1992	▲15.1	▲5,853.3	▲7.2	▲2,771.0	▲8.2%	▲1.8%	▼14.7%	n/a
1993	▲16.3	▲6,188.0	▲7.8	▲2,963.3	▲5.5%	▲0.5%	▼13.3%	n/a
1994	▲17.1	▲6,367.1	▲8.3	▲3,095.2	▲2.8%	▲1.3%	▲14.0%	81.2%
1995	▲17.8	▲6,480.3	▲8.5	▲3,099.9	▲1.8%	▲0.9%	▲14.0%	▼79.5%
1996	▲19.5	▲6,941.6	▲10.0	▲3,580.9	▲7.4%	▲1.3%	▲14.3%	▼67.4%
1997	▲21.1	▲7,366.9	▲10.8	▲3,791.3	▲6.5%	▲1.3%	▼13.4%	▼62.4%
1998	▲22.9	▲7,834.9	▲11.8	▲4,027.3	▲7.3%	▲0.6%	▼11.6%	▼60.3%
1999	▲24.1	▲8,088.6	▲12.3	▲4,136.1	▲3.9%	▲1.3%	▼9.5%	▼57.4%
2000	▲25.3	▲8,328.9	▲12.5	▼4,111.7	▲2.7%	▲1.4%	▲13.5%	▼55.8%
2001	▲26.0	▲8,394.2	▲12.7	▼4,095.0	▲0.6%	▲0.3%	▲14.0%	▲60.2%
2002	▲27.0	▲8,545.6	▲13.2	▲4,172.7	▲2.2%	▲1.0%	▼13.5%	▼59.3%
2003	▲28.7	▲8,907.5	▲13.9	▲4,312.6	▲4.2%	▲0.1%	▼13.0%	▼58.8%
2004	▲31.7	▲9,647.3	▲15.3	▲4,638.7	▲7.5%	▲0.5%	▼11.7%	▲61.2%
2005	▲35.1	▲10,466.2	▲16.6	▲4,965.2	▲7.2%	▲2.9%	▼9.8%	▲61.7%
2006	▲39.2	▲11,496.5	▲18.4	▲5,401.6	▲8.5%	▲2.5%	▼8.7%	▼56.9%
2007	▲45.2	▲12,999.8	▲21.3	▲6,127.0	▲12.1%	▲4.2%	▼6.4%	▼49.4%
2008	▲50.6	▲14,298.8	▲25.2	▲7,110.2	▲9.9%	▲8.8%	▼5.6%	▼41.6%
2009	▲51.5	▲14,318.3	▲27.1	▲7,532.4	▲1.2%	▲2.4%	▲6.6%	▼41.6%
2010	▲55.2	▲15,076.0	▲29.4	▲8,039.8	▲5.8%	▲3.5%	▼6.5%	▼40.5%
2011	▲62.7	▲16,845.1	▲34.7	▲9,314.7	▲11.3%	▲5.9%	▼4.5%	▼37.8%
2012	▲70.4	▲18,596.3	▲40.4	▲10,674.5	▲9.8%	▲5.7%	▼4.1%	▼36.0%
2013	▲79.8	▲20,727.2	▲45.6	▲11,841.9	▲6.9%	▲4.0%	▲4.1%	▼35.6%
2014	▲89.3	▲22,827.4	▲49.9	▲12,757.0	▲5.1%	▲2.6%	▲4.8%	▲36.6%
2015	▲100.5	▲25,275.2	▲54.1	▲13,606.6	▲5.7%	▲0.1%	▲5.1%	▼36.0%
2016	▲112.3	▲27,828.8	▲57.9	▲14,344.1	▲5.0%	▲0.7%	▲5.5%	▼35.3%
2017	▲125.0	▲30,511.0	▲62.2	▲15,178.3	▲5.6%	▲0.9%	▲6.1%	▼35.3%
2018	▲132.6	▲31,891.9	▲64.9	▲15,612.3	▲3.6%	▲0.8%	▼6.0%	▲37.3%
2019	▲139.1	▲32,973.2	▲66.8	▲15,831.0	▲3.0%	▲-0.4%	▲7.1%	▲42.2%
2020	▼115.5	▼26,998.8	▼52.9	▼12,373.0	▼-17.9%	▲-1.6%	▲18.5%	▲66.3%
2021	▲134.0	▲30,889.2	▲60.1	▲13,861.1	▲12.0%	▲1.4%	▼10.2%	▼62.2%
2022	▲144.6	▲32,886.6	▲64.4	▲14,643.9	▲5.0%	▲2.0%	▼9.2%	▼61.2%
2023	▲155.4	▲34,896.8	▲68.9	▲15,481.4	▲5.0%	▲2.0%	▼8.9%	▼60.6%
2024	▲166.9	▲37,005.5	▲73.8	▲16,372.1	▲5.0%	▲2.0%	8.9%	▼59.1%
2025	▲179.0	▲39,212.6	▲79.1	▲17,319.3	▲5.0%	▲2.0%	8.9%	▼57.2%
2026	▲191.9	▲41,522.5	▲84.7	▲18,326.5	▲5.0%	▲2.0%	8.9%	▼55.4%

Nominal GDP per capita in Panama was (in balboas or US dollars) 11,691 in 2002, 13,099 in 2004, 14,004 in 2005 (Prelim), 15,141.9 in 2006 (est), as reported by Office of Statistics and Census, Government of Panama. Growth from 2002 to 2006 was especially strong in the transport and communications sector, which became the biggest component of GDP, although many sectors also saw strong growth. Real GDP rose 7.5% (2003–04), 6.9% (2004–05), 8.1% (2005–06).

GDP growth in 2008 was 9.2%, reflecting a slowing of the robust growth of 11.5% seen in 2007. Although growth slowed to 2.4% in the first half of 2009, due to the global economic downturn, it is expected to improve in 2010 and is still one of the most positive growth rates in the region. Growth has been fueled by the construction sector, transportation, port and Panama Canal-related activities, and tourism. As a result of this growth, government deficit as a percentage of GDP dropped to 43% in 2009, and government-issued debt achieved investment grade in February 2010. A recent United Nations report highlighted progress in poverty reduction from 2001 to 2007—overall poverty fell from 37% to 29%, and extreme poverty fell from 19% to 12%. However, Panama still has the second-most unequal income distribution in Latin America.

== See also ==
- List of companies of Panama
- Banana production in Panama
- Beer in Panama
- Central America–United Kingdom Association Agreement
- Canada–Panama Free Trade Agreement
- Ciudad del Saber
- Coffee production in Panama
- Colón Free Trade Zone
- Economy of Central America
- Mesoamerica Project
- Panama and the World Bank
- Panama–United States Trade Promotion Agreement
