= Education in Panama =

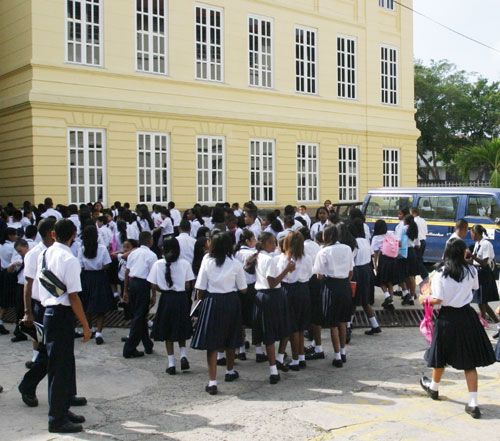
School children

Education in Panama is compulsory for the first six years of primary education and the first three years of secondary school. However, a high proportion of students complete an additional 3 years in secondary school, for a total of 6 years in secondary school. As of the 2004/2005 school year there were about 430,000 students enrolled in grades one through six (95% attendance). The total enrollment in the six secondary grades for the same period was 253,900 (60% attendance). More than 91% of Panamanians are literate.

As of 2004, more than 92,500 Panamanian students attended the University of Panama, the Technological University of Panama, West Coast University – Panama, Polytechnic University of Central America and the University of Santa Maria La Antigua, a private Catholic institution. Including smaller colleges, there are 88 institutions of higher education in Panama.

== History ==
Public education began in Panama soon after separating from Colombia in 1903. In 1906, the Panama College was found by Methodists. Nowadays it is called the Panamerican Institute. The first efforts were guided by a paternalistic view of the goals of education, as evidenced in comments made in a 1913 meeting of the First Panamanian Educational Assembly: "The cultural heritage given to the child should be determined by the social position he will or should occupy. For this reason, sex education should be different in accordance with the social class to which the student should be related." This elitist focus changed rapidly under United States influence.

By the 1920s, Panamanian education subscribed to a progressive educational system, explicitly designed to assist the able and ambitious individual in search of upward social mobility. Successive national governments gave a high priority to the development of a system of (at least) universal primary education. In the late 1930s, as much as one-fourth of the national budget went to education. Between 1920 and 1934, primary-school enrollment doubled. Adult illiteracy, more than 70 percent in 1923, dropped to roughly half the adult population in scarcely more than a decade.

By the early 1950s, adult illiteracy had dropped to 28 percent. The rate of gain had also declined and further improvements were slow in coming. The 1950s saw essentially no improvement; adult world life illiteracy was 27 percent in 1960. There were notable gains in the 1960s, however, and the rate of adult illiteracy dropped 8 percentage points by 1970. According to 1980 estimates, only 13 percent of Panamanians over 10 years of age were illiterate. Men and women were approximately equally represented among the literate. The most notable disparity was between urban and rural Panama; 94 percent of city-dwelling adults were literate but less than two-thirds of those in the countryside were—a figure that also represented continued high illiteracy rates among the country's indigenous population.

From the 1950s through the early 1980s, education enrollments expanded faster than the rate of population growth as a whole and, for most of that period, faster than the school-age population. The steepest increases came in secondary and higher education enrollments, which increased ten and more than thirty times respectively. By the mid-1980s, primary school enrollment rates were roughly 113 percent of the primary-school-aged population. Male and female enrollments were relatively equal overall, although there were significant regional variations.

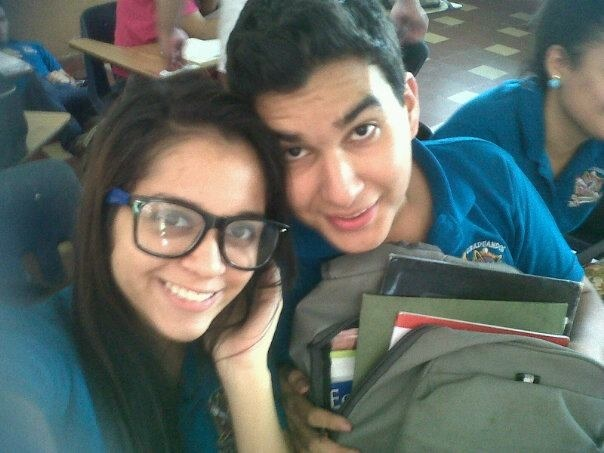
High school students from Panama City

This occurred under the rule of Omar Torrijos Herrera, who invested heavily in education and offered scholarships to universities in the Soviet Union.

Enrollments at upper levels of schooling had increased strikingly in relative and absolute terms since 1960. Between 1960 and the mid-1980s, secondary-school enrollments expanded some four-and-a-half times and higher education nearly twelve-fold. In 1965, fewer than one-third of children of secondary school age were in school and only 7 percent of people ages 20 to 24 years. In the 1970s, public schools transitioned from 8 hours of classes a day to 4 or 5 depending on grade in order to better utilize existing schools as it allows for 2 shifts a day instead of one, and a large number of schools were built under the rule of Omar Torrijos Herrera. Private schools still have 8 hours of classes a day. In the mid-1980s, almost two-thirds of secondary-school-age children were enrolled, and about 20 percent of individuals ages 20 to 24 years were in institutions of higher education.

Currently Panama has an overall literacy rate of more than 94%. Private schools are required to own their buildings. The governing entity for education, the MEDUCA, has two education systems, the regular one, and a non-regular one for students who weren't able to complete primary or secondary education around the age of 18-20 due to their living conditions or due to intellectual or physical disabilities. The non-regular system allows students to complete their studies on a reduced time frame at night, to allow students to work during the day, and there is a specialized school, the IPHE for the intellectually or physically disabled. After the age of 20, a student is no longer allowed to stay in the regular education system. An example of an alternate system school is Panasystems. Once a student transfers to the alternate system, it is not possible to transfer back to the regular system.

Schools can have 1 or 2 psychologists on staff as well as a nursery which is not always staffed. A school can have a cafeteria with meals for those who arrive early to their shift and cafeterias during recess sell items similarly to a convenience store, over a counter and there might be tables for eating, or not. There is often no place to reheat lunches and staff do have their own separate break room with tables as well as their own restrooms. During recess, students in the secondary level are allowed to leave the school, and must return before the end of recess. In elementary and preschool, students are not allowed to leave the school except at the end of the school day. No lockers are provided and students must bring their own backpacks. The government provides a card known as the Pase U, formerly Beca Universal, to allow parents to purchase school supplies, uniforms, backpacks and school textbooks, none of which are provided otherwise by the school except in rare circumstances such as for the poor. The money is given to prevent school dropouts. Panamanian law enshrines education as universal and free of charge. It is common for parents to pocket the government given money at the detriment of the student, so the government has implemented strict controls in the Pase U to prevent this.

Foreign students who transfer into Panamanian schools up to the secondary level have their school records checked and are often set back by 2 years, for example, if a foreign student was in 9th grade in their origin country, in Panama, they will often be required to start over from the 7th grade onwards. At all levels, school classrooms can receive visits from any interested party for educational or PR outreach purposes, previously authorized by the school's director and MEDUCA. Classrooms can also be used for teaching by other organizations outside school hours, which are Mondays to Fridays, 7 AM to 6 PM, and Saturdays can also be used by private schools. Private schools have dual lunches in the morning and a single shift from 7 AM to 3 PM and evening and public lunches have a single lunch per shift. Changing schools up to the last secondary level requires a good health certificate for the student from a doctor or clinic which often involves bloodwork. A school year up to the secondary level is divided into periods, formerly lasting 2 months each for a total of 8 months, called bimestres, and currently lasting 3 months each for a total of 9 months, called trimestres. It is possible for a student to fail a subject in one or more periods. The grades in a subject are averaged per period and again for the year. Depending on the number of failed periods and the student's level, they might be required to take summer classes. If severe like failing the whole year in a subject and the student is in the secondary level, they might be required to retake the subject for a whole year, in the year that immediately follows. If a student fails more than 3 subjects for the year, they will be required to retake the entire school year, no matter the level except preschool, and in elementary school this is usually accompanied by a social worker visit to the student's home.

It is not possible for a student to skip school years, unless authenticated from overseas as a foreign student. Teachers and professors up to the secondary level are required to teach specific curricula handed out by the MEDUCA. Schools keep transcripts of a student's school grades in paper and electronically and an original copy must be supplied by the student to enter a university. The transcript cannot be obtained online and the student must personally visit the school to obtain an original copy, for a fee. In schools, Classrooms are grouped by grade and grades and classrooms are kept separated from each other. On the first week of class, the class student list is posted next to the door of each classroom. It is difficult for students to be changed between classrooms and doing so requires a parent or guardian to submit a request and students are assigned to classrooms randomly with no option to choose the classroom nor professors or teachers. Public schools maintain strict dress codes for students imposed by the MEDUCA with military-style haircuts for men, no makeup for women, no accessories, electronics, toys or anything that can be a distraction or stolen during classes, no hair dyed in unnatural colors, and the use of uniforms for students which can vary according to the school, to prevent discrimination and bullying among students. Pants for men and skirts for women must have a defined length. A less strict dress code is maintained for visitors, which only bans sexually suggestive or revealing clothing, tank tops, shorts and weapons. The dress code is enforced by an inspector at the school entrance who doubles as a security guard and can refuse entry for students and visitors. Another security guard called a velador watches the school grounds at night to prevent theft. Public schools rarely have air conditioning in classrooms except for those built in the 2000s and public schools, even those in urban areas are often in poor condition without working restrooms. The average school was established in the 1960s to 1970s during Torrijos' rule. Some schools only use air conditioning in classrooms used by students in the 10th to 12th grades, as they aren't compulsory. Starting from the COVID pandemic, public schools may use Microsoft Teams to assign homework, but this is not compulsory and homework may still be assigned on paper.

Private schools often focus on a second language such as English or two additional languages such as English and Mandarin. Depending on the school this involves teaching classes in English or Mandarin, that are not the English or Mandarin classes themselves, so that the languages are learned by immersion, as a lifestyle, involving heavy reading of English or mandarin literature. Most students who speak English attended a private school, and they usually have air conditioning in classrooms. The most expensive private schools, such as international schools, have robotics classes and robotics competition teams that participate in the FIRST challenge in the US, and focus on enabling students to pursue an undergraduate degree overseas in an English-speaking country. Private schooling is seen as an area that saves the government around 563 million dollars a year. Schools have parent committees which can collaborate to supply students and the school. There are activities such as Escuela para padres, designed to boost parent participation in school activities.

The country's history text books for primary and secondary schools cover the period from the discovery of the Americas by Spanish explorers up to the separation of the country from Colombia and then skip ahead to the history and dissolution of the Panama canal zone.

Homeschooling is usually reserved only for those with physical inabilities that prevent students from physically attending school. With the introduction of platforms such as Microsoft Teams, homeschooling is no longer necessary for these situations. The MEDUCA does not allow for homeschooling and such students are considered to be dropouts, for which social programs exist.

== Educational levels of Panama ==
=== Preschool level ===
The preschool level is aimed at children between 4 and 5 years old; There are two stages of education, pre-kindergarten and kindergarten, both with a duration of 1 year each. Before 2010, only kindergarten existed. This level does not grade students on a numerical scale on their report cards. Instead, students are graded by subject on a binary system, as either I have achieved it, or I will achieve it. Preschool classrooms do often have air conditioning, as well as the school library and labs such as computer and natural science labs and administration and psychology offices, and probably also the nursery.

On all school levels, teachers and professors can also grade the manners of each student on their report cards on a non numerical, separate scale that uses 5 letters to represent very bad, bad, average, good and very good for each manner individually, although this is rarely done in practice.

=== Primary level ===
The elementary level has a duration of 6 years from 1st to 6th grade and is aimed at students between the ages of six and twelve. Basic subjects such as Spanish, English, Mathematics, Natural Science, Social Science, Arts, Technology, Physical Education, Home Education and Agriculture are taught. This level, and the preschool level, are taught exclusively in the morning, from 7 to 11-12 AM. At this level, and the prior level, schools also carry out yearly mandatory vaccinations by the Panamanian Social Security Fund, once or twice a year during school hours depending on the vaccines given, for all children and staff and may offer unused vaccines to anyone interested at the school grounds. On the secondary level, vaccinations require prior consent from parents or guardians. Up to this level, each class has a teacher assigned to it for the entire year, who teaches most subjects. For technical, manual or scientific subjects or other languages such as English, Technology, Natural Sciences, Physical Education and Home Education, separate teachers are used, and the class members are escorted between classrooms by the class's teacher. A subset of all subjects is taught depending on grade, and as the student progresses through grades, additional access to labs is granted and more activities within are performed. Formerly, Music was also taught at this level. In this level, up to the secondary level, students are graded on a scale from 1.0 to 5.0, with grades under 3.0 being fail and 3.0 and above being pass. 1.0 Means total failure to complete an assignment such as by not attempting to complete it, equivalent to a 0 in a 0 to 100 scale, and 5.0 is the perfect score, equivalent to a 100 in a 0 to 100 scale. 3.0 is equivalent to a 50 on a 0 to 100 scale.

=== First step of secondary level ===
The next stage is the pre-media cycle with a duration of 3 years from 7th to 9th grade, aimed at students between 12 and 15 years of age, equivalent to middle school. At the end of this level the student receives the Certificate of General Basic Education. The objective is to favor that all students of school age reach, according to their potential, the full development of their abilities and skills to be able to follow their professional or work path.

The areas of study are Spanish, Geography, History, Civics, Science, Technology, Typing, Arts, Industrial Arts, Music, Mathematics, Notions of Commerce and Accounting, Physical Education, Agriculture and English. Some subjects are rotated depending on year. From this level on, the student is able to pick the shift in which to take their classes, either in the morning from 7 AM to 11 PM, or in the afternoon from 12 AM to 5-6 PM. The morning shift has the most students. For this level and the next level, there is a homeroom teacher, who might also teach a given subject, and each subject is taught by a different professor, and the class does not have to leave the classroom, except for technical or scientific subjects such as Information Technology or Natural Sciences. Students are free to roam around the school during free hours and are not escorted between classrooms. As long as the student is a minor, they require a parent or guardian, who carries out all paperwork in behalf of the student and is legally responsible for them and in theory can be held accountable for the student's actions.

=== Second step of secondary level ===
It lasts 3 years (or 2 years in alternative schools) from 10th to 12th grade and is aimed at students between 15 and 18 years old. This stage is known as "Media" and is equivalent to high school. At the end of this stage the student receives the High School Diploma in one of the following modalities, depending on the school:

- Sciences
- Humanities
- Commerce
- Accounting
- Information Technology
- Agriculture
- Pedagogy
- Tourism
- Maritime Services
- Technical modalities like: Cooling and Air Conditioning, Construction, Electricity, Electronics, Autotronic or Mechanical Technology
- Institutional Service and Management
- Home Education
- Arts

The modality, known as Bachiller, is chosen by the student just before the end of pre-media, and it cannot be changed afterwards, except in rare circumstances. The modality defines the subjects the student will take. Historically, the modality was used in place of an undergraduate degree for the student to define their career, when undergraduate degrees were relatively rare. Today, the modality is used by most universities, with the notable exception of the Technological University of Panama, to filter out students who will enter a major, and graduating from a modality is no longer enough to work in the field of the modality without a finished or in progress undergraduate degree.

During this time, the student may be offered or enter extracurricular activities such as additional classes (similarly to cram schools, but non-profit such as Fundación Superate and FUNDASTEAM) or contests such as those carried out by Samsung, on time schedules opposite to their shift. NGOs run by large companies such as Banco General offer scholarships and students can also apply to scholarships at IFARHU and other institutions such as the Ministry of international relations, embassies and other NGOs. The student may be accepted into these activities based on their academic performance, depending on the particular activity. They may join NGOs such as Technovation, IEEE and Women In Tech. After completing high school, students are required to complete social service by performing manual labor or volunteer work, or taking courses, before being granted their diploma. Private schools will also place high school students in internships at companies, lasting around 3 months, which is not done by public schools.

Both the first and second steps of the secondary level, are also simply collectively called secondary level, or secondary school. It is possible for a school to offer all levels, or just one out of preschool, primary or secondary levels. Up to this level classes can have a maximum of 45 students. Schools can only have air conditioning for pre kínder, kinder and high school, or all students regardless of level.

=== Higher education ===
Higher education in Panama is divided into 2 types: University Superior and Non-University Superior. University higher education is taught in several official and private universities.

Official or state universities are autonomous state educational entities dedicated to human development and high-quality professional training at an affordable cost. They are responsible for overseeing that the professional education given in private universities meets the highest quality standards, they are also responsible for homologating the degrees obtained in universities in other countries.

The state universities of Panama are:

- University of Panama
- Autonomous University of Chiriqui
- Technological University of Panama
- International Maritime University of Panama
- Specialized University of the Americas
- Autonomous University of Indigenous Peoples

Private universities in Panama are duly accredited to offer a whole range of professions and are constantly evaluated to ensure the highest standard and quality of their careers: Some private universities are:

- Santa María La Antigua Catholic University
- Latin University of Panama
- University of the Isthmus
- University of Santander "" USantander ""
- American University of Panama
- Inter-American University of Distance Education
- Metropolitan University of Education Science and Technology "" UMECIT ""
- Inter-American University of Panama "" IPU ""
- Christian University of Panama
- Columbus University
- ISAE University
- INCAE University
- University of Art GANEXA
- University of the Caribbean

In general, undergraduate studies have a duration of 4 years, with the exceptions being exact sciences and engineering majors, that last 5 years and health sciences majors that last 6 years. Postgraduate studies have a duration that varies depending on the major. Panamanian universities have a high ratio of professors to students, around 1 professor for every class with 16 to 45 students. Classes larger than 45 are non-existent, and as a result, university auditoriums are only used for events. Universities can offer classes via video call, on online platforms, during the morning, afternoon or at night, depending on the subject, major and university. The CONEAUPA accredits individual universities, and universities can receive assistance from the University of Panama for curricula. The University of Panama is the largest in the country, and is a generalist university without focusing on any particular field. State Universities are established, and ultimately controlled, by Panama's National Assembly and the Supreme Court via Laws that create the universities and their schools, each with a Dean and student affairs office. Each school is independent from the others. Grading is done on a 0 to 100 scale with F being 0 to 60, D from 61 to 70, C from 71 to 80, B from 81 to 90, and A from 91 to 100. A score for the student throughout their major, called Indice, is calculated on a scale from 0.0 to 3.0. 0.0 is equal to an F or D grade, 1.0 to a C grade, 2.0 to a B grade, and 3.0 is the perfect grade equivalent to an A. A score of 1.0 is required to graduate as an undergraduate.

Higher non-university education is made up of "Higher Education Institutes" or "Higher Education Centers" that provide diplomas and professional technical training of the highest level.

Among the State Superior Institutes are:

- National Institute for Vocational Training and Training for Human Development (INADEH)
- Superior Police Institute President Belisario Porras.
- Higher Institute of Agriculture
- Higher Institute of Aeronautical Vocational Training
- Panama International Banking Institute
- Higher Institute of Criminal Investigations and Forensic Sciences
- Higher Education Center "Dr.Justo Arosemena" of the National Police of Panama
- Superior Academy of Benemérito Fire Department of Panama
- Higher Technical Institute of the East
- ITSE

Among the private higher institutes are:

- Higher Polytechnic Institute of America
- Higher Institute of Computing Technology
- Higher Institute of Microfinance
- Higher Institute of Haute Cuisine (ISAC)
- Higher Institute of Science and Technology
- Higher Institute of Specialized Security
- Instituto Superior The Panama Internacional Hotel School
- Higher Institute of Commerce and Education
- Higher Institute of Education and Vocational Training
- Latin American Higher Institute of Naval Administration and Technology
- Higher Institute Fly Corporation Aviation Training
- Instituto Técnico Superior de Cocina, S.A.
- Higher Pedagogical Institute
- Cooperative Education Institute
- National Vocational Training Institute
- Center for Higher Education in Administration and Security
- ASSA Study Center
- Panama Regional Studies Center
- Center for Higher Studies
- Higher Studies Technical Center
- Centro Tecnologico de Panama, which focuses on health-related fields
- Albrook Flight Institute
