= Ofelia Hooper =

Panamanian writer and professor

Ofelia Hooper Polo
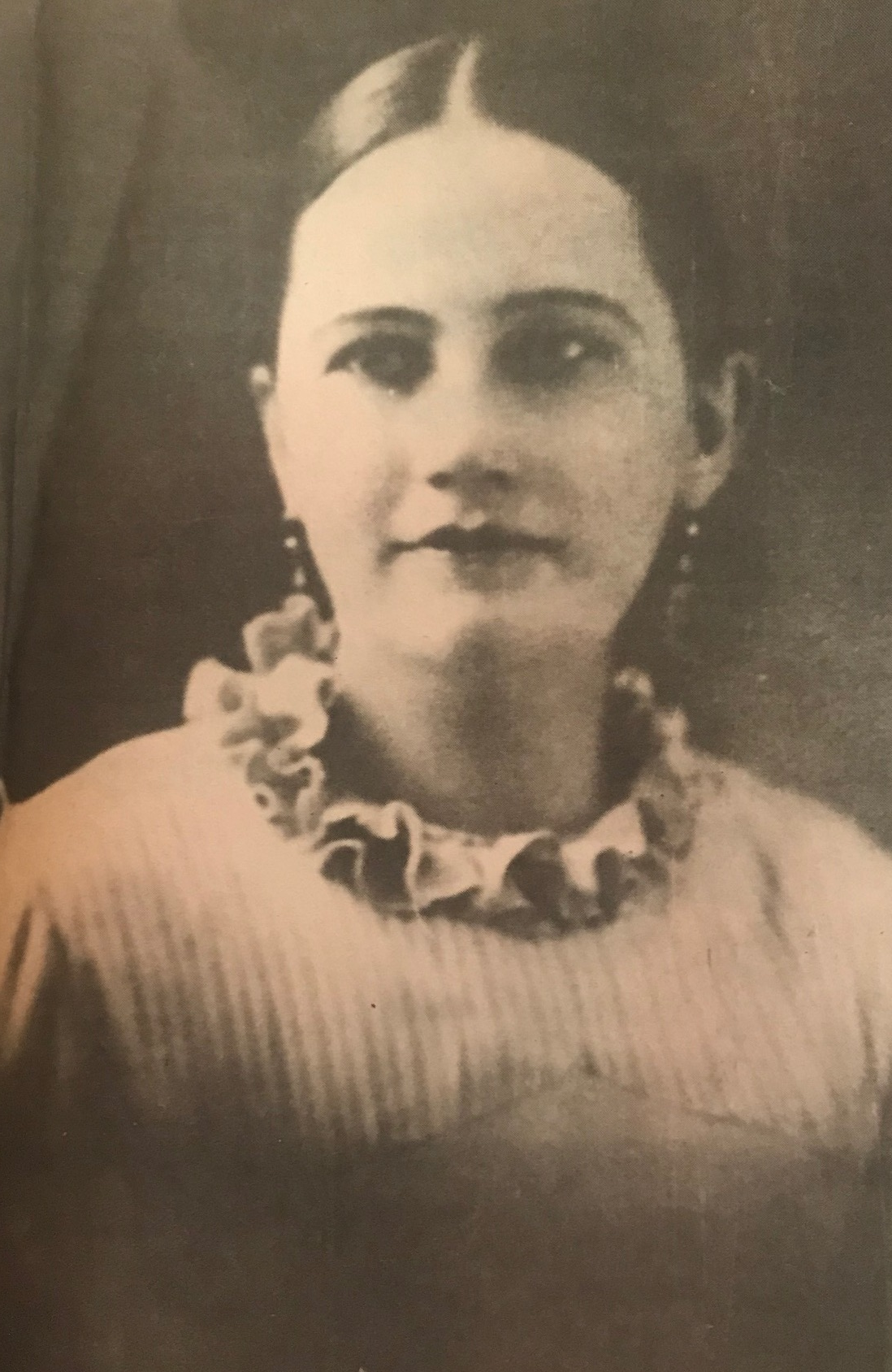
- Born: 13 November 1900; Las Minas, Panama Department, Columbia (now in Panama)
- Died: 23 September 1981 (aged 80); Panama
- Education: Universidad de Panamá
- Occupations: Sociologist, poet, professor, researcher, and activist
- Known for: Sociology
- Parent(s): Maurice Hooper and Olimpia Polo Valdés

Ofelia Hooper Polo (13 November 1900, in Las Minas, Panama – 23 September 1981) was a Panamanian sociologist, poet, professor, researcher, and civil rights activist.

She worked at several print media in Panama, including La Antena (1931) and the Frontera (1937); she also edited Primicias in 1927. Together with Eda Nela, she was one of the first proponents of the avant-garde in Panamanian poetry. She was one of the pioneers of the field of Sociology in Panama, together with Demetrio Porras (1898–1972) and Georgina Jiménez de López (1904–1994). She was also a pioneering researcher of Agriculture in Panama.

== Early life and education ==
Ofelia María Hooper Polo was born in Las Minas, a town in Herrera Province, Panama, on 13 November 1900. Her father, Maurice Hooper, was a mining engineer said to have come to the isthmus in search of gold. Her mother, Olimpia Polo Valdés, was from the Azuero Peninsula.

Hooper's early schooling took place at the poorly resourced school in Las Minas. Her family later moved to Panama City so that she and her siblings could continue their studies, and she enrolled at the Escuela Profesional de Mujeres, probably around 1913, the year it opened; the school closed three years later for lack of pupils and did not reopen until 1923. Because qualified teachers were scarce at the time, people with some schooling were often hired to teach children. Hooper became a primary-school teacher while still young, working as an ungraded rural teacher from 1917 in the town of Ocú. The experience exposed her early to the poverty, hunger and illness affecting rural families, concerns she began to explore in verse and prose during these years.

After coeducation was legally permitted, she entered the Instituto Nacional, where she obtained her teaching qualification and, around 1927, a bachillerato in Humanities. She went on to teach in Ocú and Pesé, both in Herrera Province, and for a time returned to teach in Las Minas.

When the University of Panama opened in 1935, Hooper enrolled in its Faculty of Humanities, studying under European émigré scholars who had fled fascism, among them the geographer Ángel Rubio and the German sociologist and economist Richard Behrendt, credited with founding the study of sociology in Panama. Behrendt supervised her undergraduate thesis on rural social conditions in Panama. She completed degree in social and economic sciences. Her thesis was published in 1945.

== Career ==
Unlike sociologist contemporaries such as Demetrio Porras and Georgina Jiménez de López, Hooper never taught at the University of Panama, which did not establish a degree program in sociology until 1981, the year of her death. Instead, she practiced rural sociology in a public-service capacity, spending decades at the Ministry of Agriculture (later the Ministry of Agricultural Development) in roles that kept her in direct contact with rural communities.

In 1943, while serving as an assistant to the second secretary of the Ministry of Agriculture and Commerce, Hooper was placed in charge of the sociological component of an agricultural census of Penonomé District – a pilot project, carried out through the ministry's statistics and census office, intended to improve on the methodology of earlier, inadequate censuses; its results were published that December. The census gathered demographic and descriptive data on the district's population, land distribution, education, public health, and patterns of neighborly cooperation. Hooper expanded this material into Aspectos de la vida social rural de Panamá, published in 1945, a work later credited with laying the groundwork for Panama's first national agricultural census, held in 1950.

Between the mid-1930s and mid-1940s she also helped found research centres, launch scientific publications, and organize national and international congresses, and she travelled to the United States, where she observed agricultural communities organized into cooperatives; the comparisons she drew from that visit fed into her later published work. During the 1940s she also published, in English, several articles on the Panamanian peasantry in American sociological and anthropological journals, including "Possibilities for Improvement Among Rural Panamanians" in Human Organization and "Rural Panama: Its Needs and Prospects" in Rural Sociology.

Under Cabinet Decree Law No. 17 of 22 September 1954 – Panama's first general cooperatives law – the Ministry of Agriculture created a Cooperative Education Section to implement the new legislation, and Hooper was put in charge of it. With limited resources, she established a systematic savings-and-credit cooperative development program that has continued without interruption since; during this period, several cooperative groups were formed, and the Bocatoreña Cocoa Cooperative, originally created in 1952 under earlier legislation, was formally recognised under the new law. She also contributed to a study of Panama's middle class sponsored by the Pan American Union (predecessor of the Organization of American States), co-authoring an article on the subject with researcher Carolyn de Campbell. The same 1950 project included a widely reprinted study by fellow sociologist Georgina Jiménez de López.

Hooper published a second major work, Semblanza del hombre rural de Panamá, in 1969 (also cited as 1970), broadening her focus to the country as a whole while repeatedly returning to Las Minas, a town she described as holding particular sociological interest. Copies of the book are now scarce. Researchers have identified a single surviving copy, held at the library of the Catholic University of Santa María La Antigua. She recounted travelling on horseback to conduct fieldwork in remote areas the national census did not reach, including a trip to the Costa Abajo de Colón, which she described as scenic but risky terrain for women conducting a census – terrain she said she nonetheless enjoyed.

Researchers involved in the CIEPS-led project Pioneras de la Ciencia en Panamá have argued that Hooper – despite a prolific publishing record, the cooperative research centre she created, and recognition from her contemporaries – was subsequently erased from the history of Panamanian sociology. The sociologist Ana Quijano, drawing on a distinction proposed by Patricia Madoo Lengermann and Jill Niebrugge-Brantley, has described this as erasure rather than mere neglect, since it involved a publicly recognized figure whose contributions were later effaced from the record. Quijano has argued that Hooper's absence from academia, together with gender and her preference for a sociology grounded in lived experience over formal scholarship, contributed to this erasure, and has credited her as the first person to practice rural sociology in Panama and among the first to collect systematic demographic and sociological data in the country. The historian Alfredo Figueroa Navarro has written that Hooper's standing as Panama's first sociologist has not been adequately recognized, and that her studies and her emphasis on the economic and social importance of rural life have not been properly valued.

== Literary work ==
Alongside her sociological career, Hooper was active as a writer. In 1927 she published the pamphlet Primicias, and she wrote both prose and verse touching on themes of life, death, land and identity; examples of her work appear in anthologies compiled by the literary critic Rodrigo Miró Grimaldo. She contributed lyrical pieces to the cultural periodical La Antena, founded in 1931 by Octavio Méndez Pereira, and to the left-leaning biweekly Frontera in 1937. She also wrote the lyrics for two children's songs, "Caballito Moro" and "Paloma Titibú" (also published as "Tonada de la paloma titibúa"), included in a songbook by her fellow student Gonzalo Brenes.

== Death ==
Hooper died in Panama on 23 September 1981, at the age of 80, She died the same year the University of Panama established its first degree program in sociology, a field she had practiced for decades without ever holding an academic post there.

== Recognition and legacy ==
A hall at the Instituto Cooperativo Panameño is named in Hooper's honor, and the Federación de Cooperativas de Ahorro y Crédito de Panamá (FEDPA) operates an educational foundation bearing her name, dedicated to the educational and social development of the cooperative movement. A medal for merit in the cooperative field has also been named after her. Along with Demetrio Porras and Georgina Jiménez de López, she is regarded as one of three founding figures of twentieth-century Panamanian sociology.

In 2022, the book Pioneras de la Ciencia en Panamá – produced by the CIEPS-led research project of the same name, coordinated by researcher Eugenia Rodríguez Blanco – included a chapter on Hooper by Yolanda Marco and helped renew scholarly attention to her legacy.

== Selected works ==
- Primicias (Panama City: Imprenta Nacional, 1927)
- "Aspectos de la vida social rural en Panamá", Boletín del Instituto de Investigaciones Sociales y Económicas, vol. 2, no. 3 (February 1945), pp. 71–315
- Censo agro-pecuario del distrito de Penonomé, diciembre 1943, with Juan Rivera Z. and Thomas F. Corcorán (Panama City, 1945)
- "Possibilities for Improvement Among Rural Panamanians", Human Organization, vol. 2 (1942–1943), pp. 4–10
- "Rural Panama: Its Needs and Prospects", Rural Sociology, vol. 8 (1943)
- Semblanza del hombre rural de Panamá (1969)
