= Health care in Panama =

Ciudad de la Salud (City of Health), a four hospital complex in Ancón

Health care in Panama is provided through the government and private sector businesses. The public sector is funded through the Ministry of Health (MINSA), and the Social Security Fund (CSS), which operate separate facilities. The CSS is both a healthcare provider and a pension fund administrator. It is funded by contributions from employers and employees. About 3.47 million people of the population of roughly 3.9 million were covered by its provisions in 2013, this included both the contributors and their dependents. MINSA provides low-cost facilities for those not covered. In 2014 it operated 830 health facilities.

Rural areas can face problems with the public health care system, where a lack of funding creates a shortage of beds. The majority of doctors prefer to live in Panama City where there are higher patient loads and more economic opportunities. Panama City and David have become medical tourism destinations, especially for aesthetic and orthopaedic procedures.

== Private health care ==
There are four major private hospitals. Private expenditure was 31.4% of the total health spending in 2012, mostly directly out of pocket spending. Clínica Hospital San Fernando is the oldest, dating from 1949. The law entitles retirees to a 20–25% discount on medical services. A medical franchise, MiniMed, started in 2011 and has seven walk-in primary care facilities.

== Hospitals ==
Emergency medical services are primarily in Panama City where 911 service is available. Outside Panama City and David, they drop off dramatically. Boquete, Chiriquí has limited capability despite a large ex-pat population. In the indigenous comarcas MINSA is the only provider and there are very limited hospital facilities. From 2009 to 2014 a medical city, Ciudad Hospitalaria in Panama City, a network of smaller health care facilities and five regional hospitals were initiated:

- Anita Moreno Hospital in Los Santos District,
- Manuel Amador Guerrero Hospital in Colón Province,
- Metetí General Hospital in Darién Province
- Bugaba Hospital, slated for Chiriquí Province.
- Luis "Chicho" Fabrega hospital in Veraguas

See also List of hospitals in Panama.

Prices are significantly cheaper than in the United States or other highly developed nations, but in comparison to the average Panamanian wage is proportionally equal. Some doctors are highly trained in the United States but few are board-certified. Many are trained in high quality medical schools in Spain, Mexico, Panama, and a few in Cuba.
