= Columbus University =

Columbus University may refer to:

- Columbus University (Panama) a university in Panama
- Columbus State University in the U.S. state of Georgia
- Columbus University (Washington, D.C.) established by the Knights of Columbus and later merged into Catholic University of America
- Ohio State University in Columbus, Ohio
- The fictional school depicted in the film Higher Learning
- Columbus University (Louisiana), an unaccredited institution of higher learning in Louisiana
