= Banana production in Panama =

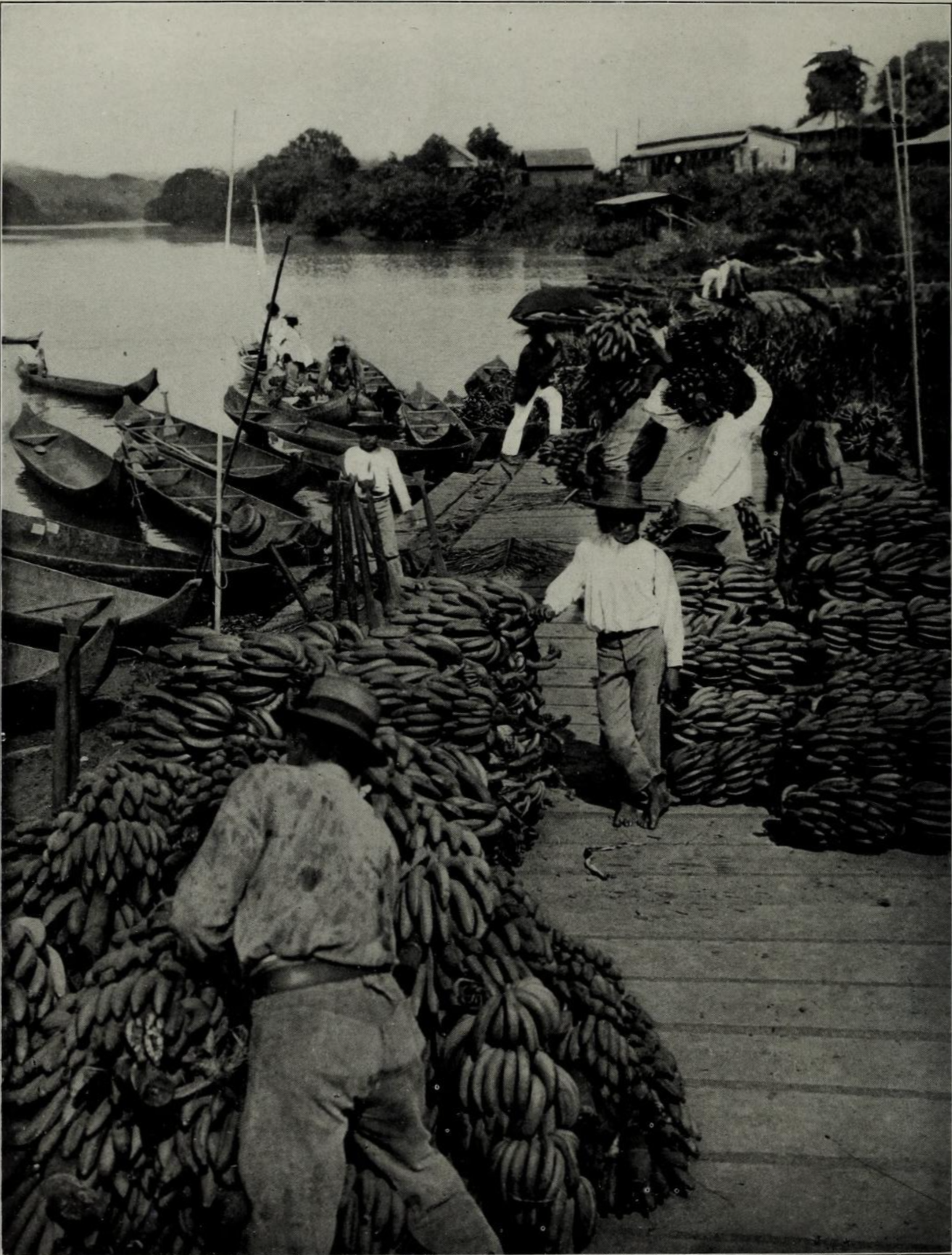
Loading bananas onto boats on the Chagres River, Panama in the early 20th century.

Banana production in Panama has traditionally played an important role in the Panamanian economy since around the beginning of the twentieth century.

== Information ==
Bananas were the leading export item, and in 1985 accounted for 23 percent (US$78 million) of total exports. In that year, the Chiriquí Land Company, a subsidiary of United Brands (formerly United Fruit Company), produced 70 percent of all bananas, followed by private Panamanian producers (25 percent) and the state-owned Corporación Bananera del Atlántico (5 percent). The volume of bananas produced in Panama peaked in 1978 and slowly declined in the 1980s. Observers doubted that United Brands would expand its production in Panama because bananas could be produced more cheaply in Costa Rica and Ecuador.

== History ==
The history of banana production in Panama virtually coincides with that of United Brands, which has been in Panama since 1899. The company built railroads, port facilities, and storage areas for the processing and export of bananas. In the 1930s, a disease seriously curtailed banana production.

In the 1950s, a disease began killing off the banana crops in Panama. The disease was caused by fungus. During the disease, Panamanians switched to Cavendish bananas, because the disease did not affect that species.

In the early 1970s, a "banana war" erupted when banana-producing countries disagreed among themselves and with United Brands about an export tax on bananas. Panama threatened to take over United Brands' plantations. An agreement was reached in 1976 to tax banana exports. In that year, the tax provided the government with US$10 million, nearly 4 percent of all revenues. In addition, United Brands sold all 43,000 hectares (110,000 acres) of land that it owned in Panama to the government; payment was in tax credits. The government leased back to United Brands over 15,000 hectares (37,000 acres) for banana production and export operations. Part of the excess land went to the government's newly established banana companies.

On June 1, 2017, Del Monte began a 20-year contract with Panama in order to grow bananas in the Baru district, in Chiriqui. President Juan Carlos Varela approved the deal.
