= Panamanian Social Security Fund =

Ministry of the Republic of Panama

- Caja de Seguro Social

Agency overview
- Jurisdiction: Panama
- Employees: 34,350 (2020)
- Annual budget: B/. 6,108,700 million (2020)
- Agency executive: Dino Mon, General Director
- Website: http://www.css.gob.pa

The Panamanian Social Security Fund (CSS) or Caja de Seguro Social Panameña (as it is known in Spanish) is a public institution of the Republic of Panama that is in charge of the planning, control and administration of the contingencies of the social security of Panama. The Social Security Fund was founded on March 21, 1941, by means of Law No. 23. The main headquarters of the Social Security Fund is in the capital of Panama, Panama City. This public institution is the one most frequently visited by Panamanian citizens regarding the issue of social security. In the National Health System of Panama, the Social Security Fund insures 80% of the population, of health services and economic benefits, 20% of the so-called uninsured population, is attended at their cost in the National System of health by the Ministry of Health.

== Function ==
The Panamanian Social Security Fund is in charge of administering and governing the social security system of the Republic of Panama. The social security fund is responsible for coordinating pensions, plans such as survival, disability and old age. The social security fund also offers benefits to the civilian population, such as: maternity benefits and sickness benefits, all these benefits are administered by the social security fund of the republic of Panama.

== Headquarters ==
The headquarters of the Social Security Fund is located in the capital of Panama, Panama City, in the district of Ancón, Clayton, on Calle Demetrio Basilio Lakas. Currently where the headquarters of the Social Security Fund is located, part of the Panama Canal Zone was located, which was an unincorporated territory of the United States.

== General management ==
The positions of the directors and executive directors, together with their respective officials, of the Social Security Fund Board of Directors:

- Director general: Dino Mon
- Deputy director general: Rogelio A. Gordón
- General secretary: Marisela Bernal C.
- Executive director of Health Services and Benefits: Felix Camargo Ardines

=== Executive Director of Human Resources ===
- Roberto Crespo Lezcana

=== Executive Director of Finance and Administration ===
- José Croston

=== Executive Director of Economic Benefits ===
- Dídimos Barrios

=== Executive Director of Legal ===
- Benicio Robinson

=== Executive Director of Insured Services ===
- Alfredo Petterson

=== Executive Director of Innovation and Transformation ===
- Carlos Rodriguez

=== Executive Director of Communications ===
- Mara Rivera

=== Executive Director of Infrastructure and Support Services ===
- Carlos Rodriguez
