= Georgina Jiménez de López =

Panamanian sociologist (1904–1994)

- Born: Georgina Isabel Jiménez de López; 15 February 1904; Panama City, Panama
- Died: 1994 (aged 89–90)
- Citizenship: Panama (by birthplace); United States of America^{[explain status]}
- Occupations: Sociologist, writer, professor, feminist, activist
- Years active: 1940–1994
- Political party: Feminist Party of Panama
- Parents: Antonio Jiménez (father); Paula Rivera Urriola (mother)

Georgina Isabel Jiménez de López (15 February 1904 – 1994) was a Panamanian sociologist, writer, professor, researcher, feminist, and human rights activist. She was the first female Professor of Sociology in Panama.

== Biography ==
Georgina Isabel Jiménez de López was born to parents Paula Rivera Urriola and Antonio Jiménez in Panama City on 15 February 1904, but grew up in Chiriquí. After graduating as a teacher from the normal school of Institutoras in 1922, Jiménez found work at several Panamanian educational institutions and continued to pursue her education. In 1932, she graduated with a bachelor's degree in science from New York University. While working towards a master's degree and then doctorate in political science from Columbia University, Jiménez made income translating and teaching Spanish and lecturing at Panamanian schools and women's clubs.

As a feminist, Jiménez participated in the movement of Clara González in Panama and became one of the founding members of the Feminist Renewal Center of Los Santos, which she would represent at the First Feminist Congress in 1923. She would also was a member of the National Union of Women and held became its secretary in 1945.

Jiménez, Demetrio Porras, and Ofelia Hooper became the pioneers of sociology in Panama and herself became the first woman in the country to teach this discipline in higher education.
