= Odette Cortez =

Panamanian dancer and folklorist (born 1987)

- Born: 27 May 1987 (age 39); Panama City, Panama
- Education: Universidad Latina de Panamá
- Occupations: Choreographer, dancer and folklorist
- Employer: Folklore Dance Studio

Odette Marina Cortez Palacios (born 27 May 1987) is a Panamanian choreographer, dancer and folklorist. She is a partner and founder of the Folklore Dance Studio and has represented Panama at international dance events like the Yilan International Folklore Festival and Children's Folk Games (YICFFF) in Taiwan.

== Biography ==
Cortez was born on 27 May 1987 in Panama City, Panama. She grew up among musicians and folklorists as the daughter of the Panamanian piano accordionist Ormelis Cortez, and the granddaughter of the Panamanian violinist, piano accordionist and composer Escolastico Cortez, who was known as "Colaco" and was the composer of the song Guarare, Guarare, Guarare.

Cortez studied at the Universidad Latina de Panamá (Latin University of Panama) and speaks both English and Spanish. She is a dancer who specialises in Panamanian folk dances in the national folk costume of embroidered Pollera and Tembleques hair ornaments. She is a partner and founder of Folklore Dance Studio, where she trains dancers, including Margarita Henríquez, and disseminates Panamanian traditions such as skirt movement. She performs dances such as Diablicos Sucios, Flamenco, Santeño (styles from the Province of Los Santos) and Tamborito. Dancers from her studio participate in cultural events such as the annual Panama Folklore Gala and traditional flamenco performances at Anita's Peña.

In 2013, Cortez represented Panama alongside the Panama Folk Music Ensemble at the Yilan International Folklore Festival and Children's Folk Games (YICFFF) in Yilan, Taiwan, following an invitation to perform from the International Council of Organizations of Folklore and Traditional Arts Festivals (CIOFF). Cortez and the delegation performed a Panamanian style adaption of the dance Dew Dew Dong, accompanied by a folk song from Taiwan. Cortez and the fellow Panamanian artists were featured on Taiwanese television and in national newspapers.

In 2019, Cortez performed at a celebration of the 500th anniversary of Panama City. In 2023, she represented Panama with the Folklore Dance Studio delegation at the 2023 All Dance Intercontinental, held in the Dominican Republic. She has also performed in Washington D. C., Buenos Aires, Madrid, Lisbon, Taipei, Santo Domingo, Cancún, Miami, New York, Barranquilla and San José.
