= María Cristina Chen Stanziola =

Panamanian jurist and judge

President of the Supreme Court of Justice of Panama
- Incumbent
- Assumed office 2 January 2026
- Preceded by: María Eugenia López Arias

Judge of the Supreme Court of Justice of Panama
- Incumbent
- Assumed office 3 January 2022
- Preceded by: Luis Ramón Fábrega

Personal details
- Education: Universidad Católica Santa María La Antigua; Latin University of Panama; University of Salamanca

María Cristina Chen Stanziola is a Panamanian jurist and judge. She has been serving as judge of the Supreme Court of Justice of Panama since 2022 and as its president since 2026.

== Education ==
Chen Stanziola obtained her law degree with honors from the Latin University of Panama in 1996 and her PhD in Law from the Universidad Católica Santa María La Antigua in 2013, as well as a PhD in Administration, Finance and Justice in the Welfare State from the University of Salamanca. She holds several specialist master’s degrees in commercial law, procedural law, constitutional law and corporate legal consultancy from universities in Panama, Spain and Italy.

== Career ==
She has worked as lawyer and professor of commercial law at the University of Panama. In October 2021, President of Panama Laurentino Cortizo appointed her judge of the Third Chamber for Administrative and Labour Disputes of the Supreme Court of Justice of Panama, succeeding Luis Ramón Fábrega.

On 2 January 2026, the Supreme Court elected her the new president of the court and was sworn in on that day.
