= Agriculture in Panama =

Economic sector in Panama

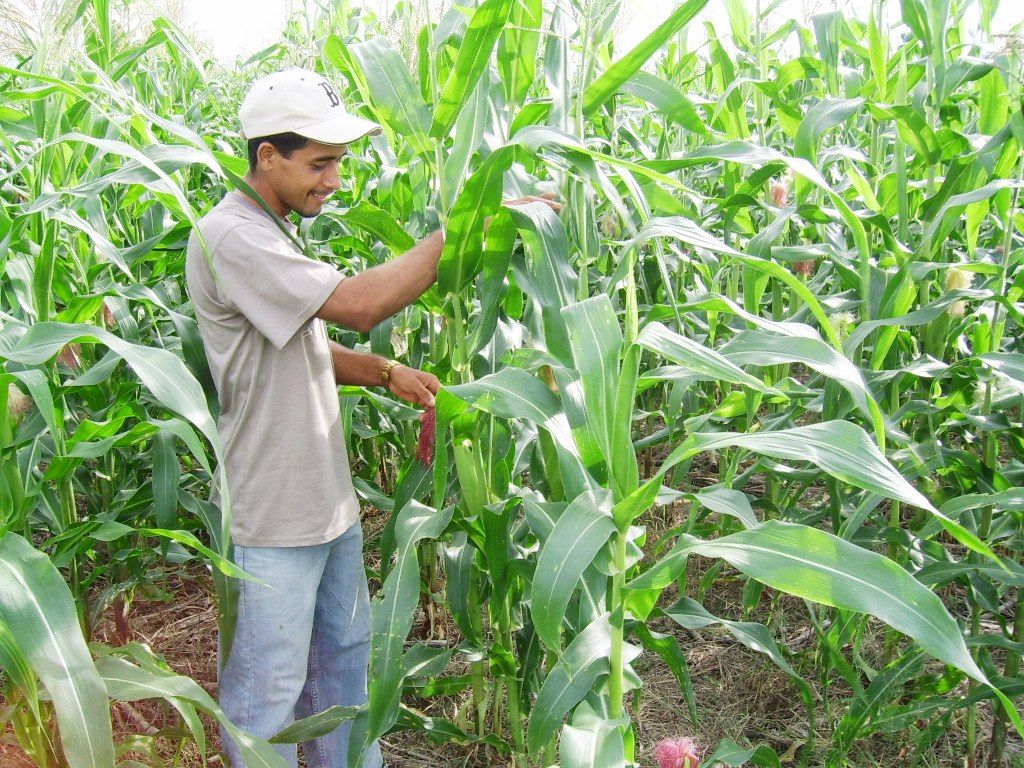
Maize cultivation in Panama.

Agriculture in Panama is an important sector of the Panamanian economy. Major agricultural products include bananas, cocoa beans, coffee, coconuts, timber, beef, chicken, shrimp, corn, potatoes, rice, soybeans, and sugar cane.

In 2009 agriculture and fisheries made up 7.4% of Panama's GDP. Panama is a net food importer and the U.S. is its main supplier. Agriculture employs many Panamanians (in relation to agriculture's percentage of Panamanian GDP) because many farmers are engaged in subsistence farming.

== Agricultural products ==
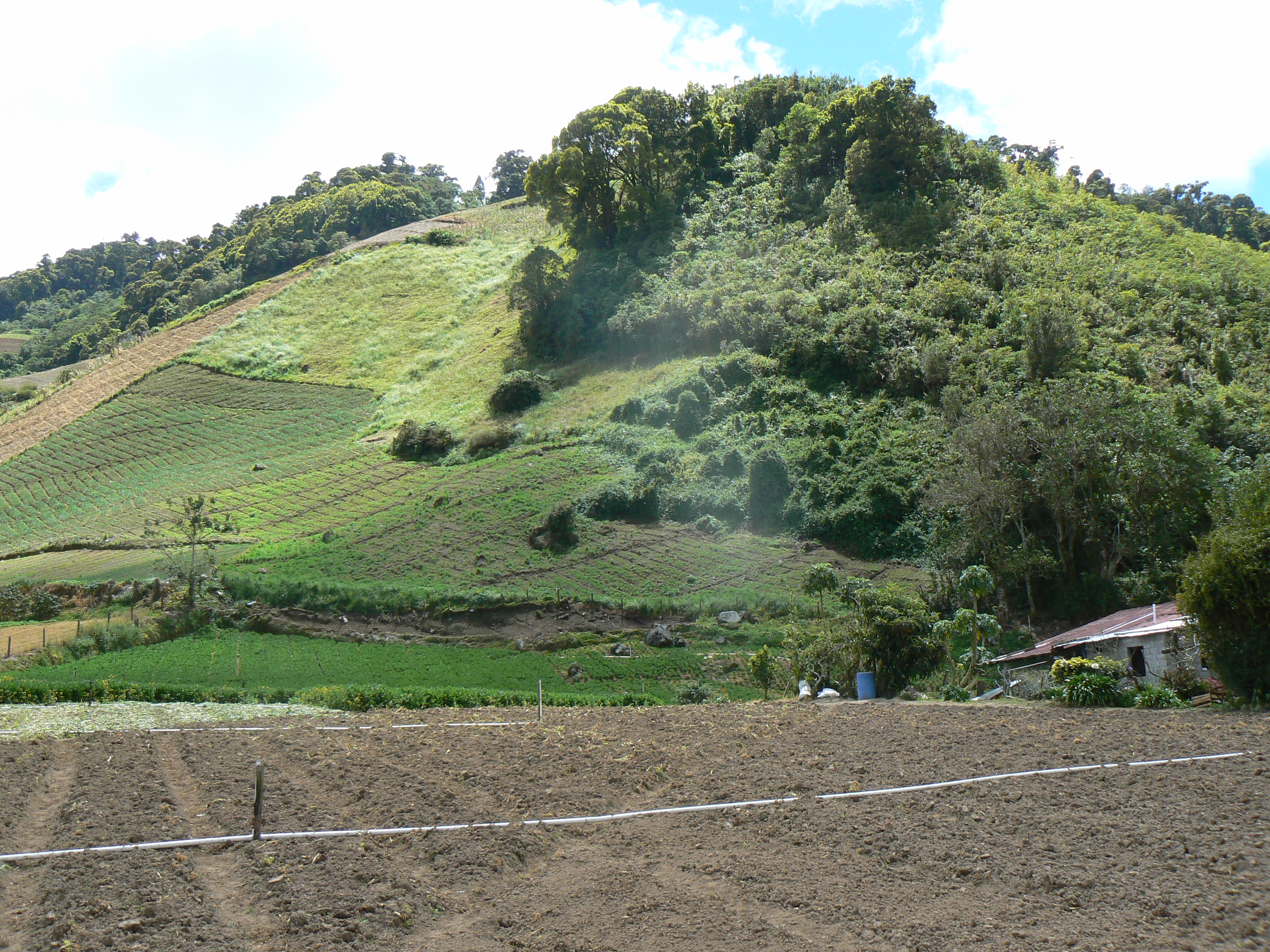
A farm in Panama.

Major agricultural products in Panama include bananas and other fruit, corn, sugar, rice, coffee, shrimp, timber, vegetables, and livestock. As of 1996, the important agricultural product exports included bananas ($96.4 million), shrimp ($29.2 million), sugar ($14.1 million), coffee ($11.3 million), and beef ($2.9 million).

In 2018, Panama produced 2.9 million tons of sugar cane, 400 thousand tons of banana, 314 thousand tons of rice, 112 thousand tons of maize, 109 thousand tons of pineapple, 46 thousand tons of palm oil, 40 thousand tons of oranges, in addition to smaller productions of other agricultural products such as watermelon, cassava, coconut, onion, potato, tomato, yam etc.

=== Rice ===
In 2000–2001 (April to March), there were 1,600 domestic rice producers who planted 71,000 hectares and harvested 64,000 hectares (7,000 hectares were lost to dry weather). Total production was 285,091 metric tons, rough basis in 2000–2001, compared to 269,500 tons in 1999–2000. These figures include only mechanized production and that some small volume is produced by traditional labor.

As production of rice barely supplies total consumption, stocks run very low each year prior to harvest in September.

Rice is the main staple and can be seen at the table at all hours, including at breakfast in some areas of the country. Therefore, politicians have made a tradition of including protection to rice farmers in all political platforms. Asian immigrants add to traditional high per capita consumption.

=== Sugar ===
Panama is expected to produce 2 million tons of sugar cane in marketing year 2000 yielding 185.6 tons of raw sugar. All four Panamanian sugar mills are private with the last two government-owned mills privatized in 1999. Two of the new players have created tension within the sector by introducing innovative business practices thereby increasing competition and triggering a battle with the more traditional mills. One result is that there is no longer the exchange of information that used to take place, which in turn makes it more difficult to collect accurate information.

Although production has been increasing, Panama had been exporting smaller quantities in recent years and has even been importing refined sugar. For example, in 1999, Panama imported 3,500 tons of refined sugar with a value of $1.7 million from Mexico and 153 tons with a value of $23,000 from Colombia, both refined sugar.

=== Bananas ===
In 1997, the value of banana exports from Panama was $59.8 million.

=== Shrimp ===
With approximately 40 shrimp farms covering an area of 9,000 hectares, combined with efficient high technology and good management practices, the Panamanian shrimp farming industry is responsible for 80% of fish products exports. This amounted to a total of $165 million exported during 1998. In that year, shrimp exports were bigger than traditional banana exports for the first time.

=== Coffee ===
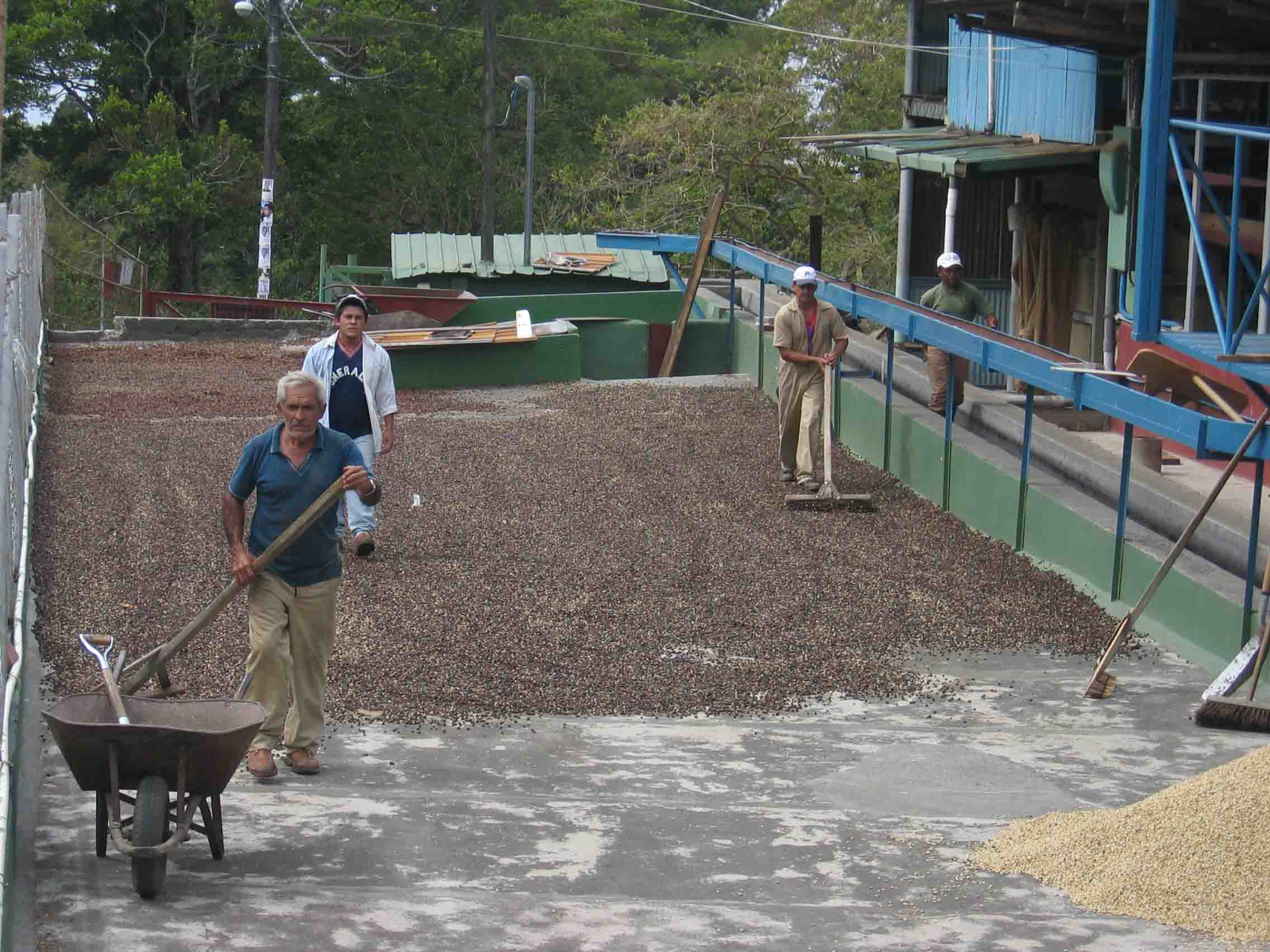
Drying coffee beans in Boquete.

For the export season ending in 2007, Panama generated $15.1 million in sales. The majority of these exports went to the U.S., with Canada, Europe and Asia being purchasers as well.

=== Livestock ===
The main livestock products in Panama are beef, veal, chicken, and pork. Panama has the highest rate of chicken consumption per capita in Latin America.

==== Cattle ====
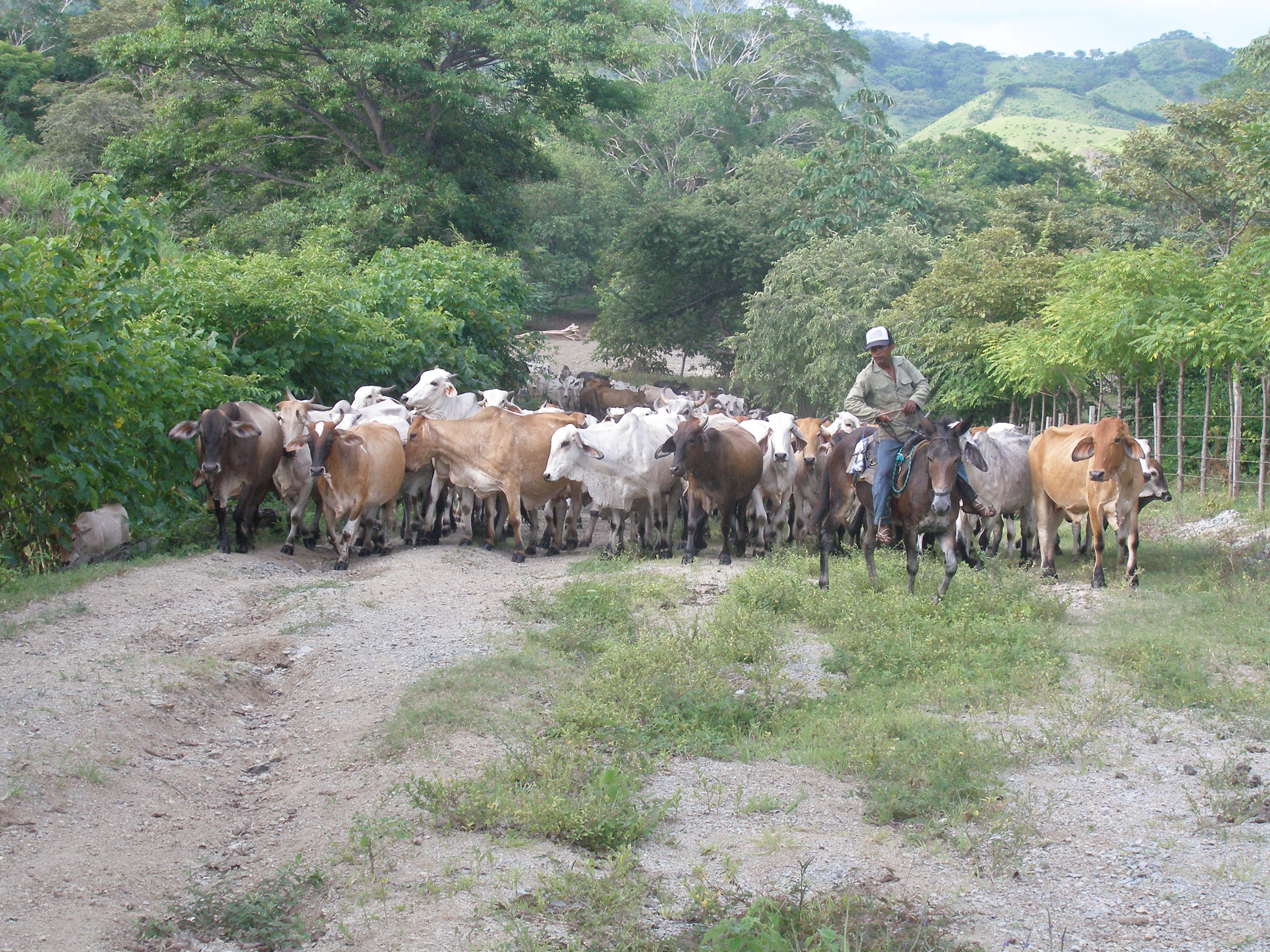
Cattle being herded in Panama.

As of 1997, there were 1,362,000 head of cattle in Panama. That year, Panama slaughtered 320,803 head and exported 5,280 head. Panama only imported 40 head of breeding cattle during 1997. Panama exported $7.8 million of beef products in 1997 and imported $1.4 million.

==== Poultry and eggs ====
Average annual poultry slaughter is 41 million birds, which yield approximately 48,000 MT of poultry meat. Panama imported $2.2 million worth of poultry meat during 1997, while exporting $0.4 million. Panama imported over $900,000 eggs for incubation during 1997, mainly from the United States. The poultry industry continues growing at a strong pace, covering local demand and allowing exports to Central America and the Caribbean.

Panama depends on imported corn to feed its flocks and thereby the competitiveness of its poultry production is dependent on the world price of feed grains. In 1997, Panama exported mainly to Curazao and a smaller quantity to San Andres (Colombia). The total, including whole, parts, and offal, amounted to approximately $418,000. Panama exported $3,089 worth of turkeys to Curazao.

Panama produces approximately 500,000 commercial eggs per day. Production and export of fertile eggs is picking up, since high quality of breeders from Panama is gaining recognition. Panama exported $1.3 million worth of eggs for incubation in 1997, mainly to Central America and also to Colombia.

=== Vegetables ===
Panamanian vegetable production is concentrated in the highlands of Chiriqui province. Until recently, there has been little competition with the result that there has been scant incentive in improve production and marketing techniques. Moreover, little thought given to the consumer with prices often high and quality low. This situation created an opportunity for dependable suppliers of high quality produce. Over the past year, as Panama has gradually shifted its trade policies to more open markets, local importers have started bringing in increasing quantities of produce, particularly from the United States.

==== Beans ====
Panama has been a traditional importer of lentils, dry beans and kidney beans. There is some domestic kidney bean production that supplies much of the market when international prices climb and compete for the market the rest of the time. There is no lentil production in Panama and no demand for black beans.

=== Forestry ===
Panama has significant stocks of timber, mainly mahogany. There are also 61,000 hectares of planted forests, mainly teak and pine. However, concerns over deforestation have led to increased regulation of the timber industry. During the 1990s, Panama annually lost 2.1 percent of its forested areas to logging. However, after 1996, timber production dropped by 50 percent. There are 3 major timber companies which own 41 sawmills. Annual output is now around 60,000 cubic meters of forest products.

=== Other grains ===
Panamanian corn production, including both mechanized and non-mechanized production, was 105,000 tons in 1996–97. Panama imported 182,676 tons, all from the United States. Use for human consumption amounted to 103,676 tons and for animal production 184,000 tons.

There is no wheat, barley, or oat production in Panama, due to unfavorable climatic conditions.

Panama normally produces an average of 2,000 tons of sorghum per year, which is sold to industries that process animal foodstuffs. This supplies about 90% of total demand.

Farmers use only a low level of technology and expect that industries will acquire the grain immediately after harvest. Since farmers do not have sufficient storage capacity for the entire harvest, they are at a disadvantage when marketing their product in a hurry. Moreover, with international prices usually lower than local prices, industries prefer to import the grain.

== History ==
For centuries, agriculture was the dominant economic activity for most of Panama's population. After construction of the Panama Canal, agriculture fell as a proportion of total GDP. Agriculture represented 29 percent of Panamanian GDP in 1950, and just over 9 percent in 1985. In 2009 agriculture and fisheries made up 7.4% of Panama's GDP. Agriculture employs many Panamanians (in relation to its percentage of Panama's GDP) because many farmers are engaged in subsistence farming. The percentage of Panama's labor force in agriculture has fallen from 46 percent in 1965 to 26 percent in 1984.

Between 1969 and 1977 the government undertook agrarian reform and attempted to redistribute land. The expanded role of the state in agriculture improved social conditions in rural areas, but long-term economic gains arising from the agrarian reform were modest.

In 1985, crops accounted for 63.3 percent of value added in agriculture, followed by livestock (29.5 percent), fishing (4.3 percent), and forestry (2.9 percent). Despite its relative decline, agriculture was the main supplier of commodities for export, accounting for over 54 percent of total export earnings in 1985. The agricultural sector satisfied most of the domestic demand. The principal food imports were wheat and wheat products, because climatic conditions precluded wheat cultivation. In 1985 the value of food imports was US$108.7 million (8.8 percent of total imports), with half of that being food exports.

In the early and mid-1980s, the government sought to reverse the decline of agriculture by diversifying agricultural production, lowering protection barriers, and reducing the state's role in agriculture. In March 1986, the government instituted major changes in the agricultural incentives law and removed price controls, trade restrictions, farm subsidies, and other supports.

Throughout the 1990s, agricultural production increased by an average of 5 percent per year, with the exception of 1998 when Hurricane Mitch caused extensive damage to crops. In 1998, agricultural exports were valued at US$409.3 million (out of Panama's total exports of $640 million), while imports totaled US$397.7 million. That same year bananas accounted for 33 percent of Panama's exports, shrimp 11 percent, sugar 4 percent, and coffee 2 percent.

In 1999, sugar cane production was at 2.05 million metric tons, bananas at 650,000 metric tons, rice at 232,370 metric tons and corn at 89,806 metric tons. The main export crop was bananas with exports worth US$182 million in 2000. There has been a steady increase in tropical fruit exports which were worth US$14 million in 2000.

== Land use ==
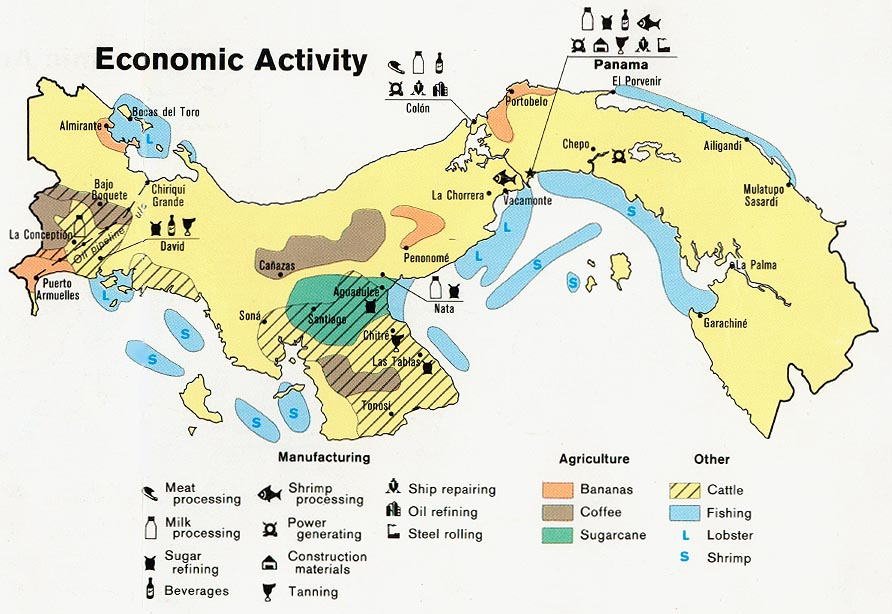
A map of economic activity in Panama, including agriculture, 1981.

About half of the land in Panama is used for agriculture. Panama's land area totals approximately 7.7 million hectares, of which forests account for 4.1 million hectares, followed by pasture land (1.2 million hectares), and permanently cultivated fields (582,000 hectares). About 2 percent of the land was used for roads and urban areas. Nearly all of the cultivated and pasture land was originally forested. A large amount of virgin land has been opened up for cultivation by the Pan-American Highway.

Panama's climate and geology impose major constraints on the development of agriculture. Heavy rainfall throughout the year prevents cultivation of most crops on the Atlantic side of the continental divide. The Pacific side has a dry season (December to April) and accounts for most of the cultivated land. The mountainous terrain also restricts cropping.

In addition Panama does not have high quality soils. Most of the areas classified as cultivable are so considered on the assumption that farmers will practice conservation measures, but many do not. The topsoil is thin in most areas, and erosion is a serious problem. Most of the nearly level areas conducive to cultivation are in the provinces of Los Santos, Coclé, Veraguas, and Chiriquí.

=== Slash and burn agriculture ===
A further constraint on production is the practice of slash-and-burn cultivation, in which trees, brush, and weeds are cut and then burned on the patch of ground selected for cultivation. Indians utilized the slash-and-burn method for centuries, and the Spanish made few changes in techniques. In the 1980s, most farmers practiced a slash-and-burn type of shifting cultivation. The thin and poor-quality topsoil yielded an initially good harvest, followed by a smaller harvest the second year. Typically, the land was cultivated for only two years, and then the farmer repeated the process on another plot, allowing the first plot to rest ten years before refarming.

Much of the farming was of a subsistence nature and accomplished with a minimum of equipment. Plowing was generally not practiced on subsistence farms; the seeds were placed in holes made by a stick. Tree cutting, land clearing, weeding, and harvesting were accomplished with a few kinds of knives, principally the machete and the axe, which comprised the major farm implements.

== Land tenure and agrarian reform ==
Before the 1950s, land was readily available to anyone who was willing to clear and plant a plot. The cutting and clearing of forests greatly accelerated as the population increased. By the 1960s, subsistence farmers sometimes reduced the rest period of cleared plots from ten years of fallow to as few as five years because of the unavailability of farm land. The reduced fallow period diminished soil fertility and harvests. Consequently, cropped acreage peaked during the 1960s. The hard life and low income farmers accelerated the exodus of workers from the countryside to the cities.

The long period when new land was easily obtainable contributed to a casual attitude toward land titles. In 1980 32.9 percent of the 151,283 farms had such titles. The decline in available agricultural land has made land titling more necessary. Moreover, insecure tenure has been a particularly severe constraint to improved techniques and to commercial crop production. The cost of titling a piece of land has been too high for most subsistence farmers.

Between 1969 and 1977, the government attempted to redistribute land through land reform. In the late 1980s the distribution of land and farm incomes remained very unequal. In 1980, 58.9 percent of farms had an annual income below US$200. The issue of unequal land distribution has not been as explosive in Panama as in many other Latin American countries. This was because of the service-oriented nature of the economy and because about half of the population lived in or near Panama City. Also, about 95 percent of all farm land was owner-operated, and virtually all rural families owned or occupied a plot.

In an effort to redistribute land, the government acquired 500,000 hectares of land and expropriated an additional 20 percent of the land. About three-quarters of the land acquired was in the provinces of Veraguas and Panamá. By 1978 over 18,000 families (about 12 percent of rural families in the 1970 census) had access to either individual plots or collectively held land as a result of the redistribution. The land acquisition created uncertainty and adversely affected private investment in agriculture, slowing production in the 1970s.

As part of its agrarian reform, the government placed heavy emphasis on organizing farmers into collectives for agricultural development. Several organizational forms were available, the two most important being asentamientos (settlements) and juntas agrarias de producción (agrarian production associations). The distinctions between the two were minor and became even more blurred with time. Both encouraged pooling of land and cooperative activity. In some instances land was worked collectively. Other organizational forms included marketing cooperatives, state farms, and specialized producers' cooperatives for milk, chickens, or pigs. Growth of these agricultural organizations slowed by the mid-1970s and some disbanded as emphasis shifted to consolidation.

The cost of agrarian reform was high. The government channeled large amounts of economic aid to organized farmers. Rural credit was greatly increased; farm machinery was made available; improved seeds and other inputs were supplied; and technical assistance was provided. Cooperative farm yields increased, but these higher yields were not impressive, considering the level of investment. Despite the high costs of the government programs, incomes of cooperative farmers remained low. After the mid-1970s, the government changed its policy toward cooperatives and stressed efficiency and productivity instead of equity.

Although the economic results of agrarian reform were disappointing, the social conditions of most farmers improved. The number of rural residents with access to safe water increased by 50 percent between 1970 and 1978. Improved sewerage facilities, community health programs, and rural clinics reduced mortality rates considerably. Major expansion of educational facilities, including education programs for rural residents, helped rural Panamanians become better educated and more mobile.

=== International Business ===
Several large international companies dominate Panamanian exports, especially when it comes to export crops such as bananas. For instance, the U.S. company, Chiriqui Land Company, which operates under the brand name Chiquita, is one of the largest landowners in Panama, as well as the main banana exporter. Other major foreign agricultural companies include Del Monte Corporation and Dole Foods.

== See also ==
- Economy of Panama
