= Panama and the World Bank =

Relationship between Panama and the World Bank

Flag of Panama.

The World Bank Group, composed of five institutions, works together with the Panamanian government to reduce poverty and increase prosperity. Panama first became a member of the World Bank Group on March 14, 1946. In the past decade, Panama's annual growth has increased by 7.2% in the span of 12 years, making it one of the fastest growing economies in the world. In 2019, Panama was ranked the second fastest growing economy in Latin America by the World Bank. As of 2019, Panama has $435.59 million US dollars being distributed amongst seven projects, all geared toward their overall goal of poverty reduction and indigenous inclusion. Continuing with their efforts to reduce extreme poverty, the World Bank along with efforts of the Panamanian government has reduced poverty from 39.9% to 26.2% while extreme poverty has been reduced by an estimated 15.6% to 11.3% from 2014 to 2019. As of late 2019, there is an estimated $213.26 million US dollars of undisbursed loans.

== Strategies as of 2019 ==
The five institutions of the World Bank are the IBRD, IDA, IFC, MIGA, and ICSID. Currently, Panama has projects with three institutions of the World Bank given they are not eligible for IDA Loans and have no connections with ICSID. They have a total of 66 disclosed projects with IBRD, 20 with IFC and 2 with MIGA. Panama holds 0.07% of all IBRD and IFC votes, 0.04% of IDA votes, and 0.21% of MIGA votes, respectively. Out of these three institutions, IBRD financing have impacted the economy of Panama the most from 2008 to 2019. Working together, these five institutions and the Panamanian government developed the Country Partnership Framework (CPF) of 2015–2021 in 2015 to outline the specific areas needed for improvement and development in the country. As outlined by this plan, there are three specific areas of focus needed for the continued improvement of the country: the support of continued growth, the inclusion and opportunity for growth of marginalized and indigenous communities and supporting resilience and sustainability through the country. Following the goals of the CPF, the Panamanian government ensures the support of growth through the economy with investments in infrastructure and logistics projects. Additionally, the Panamanian government has increased funding for the tourism sector as it has shown to increase economic growth by 0.4% in Latin America countries.

== Select projects ==
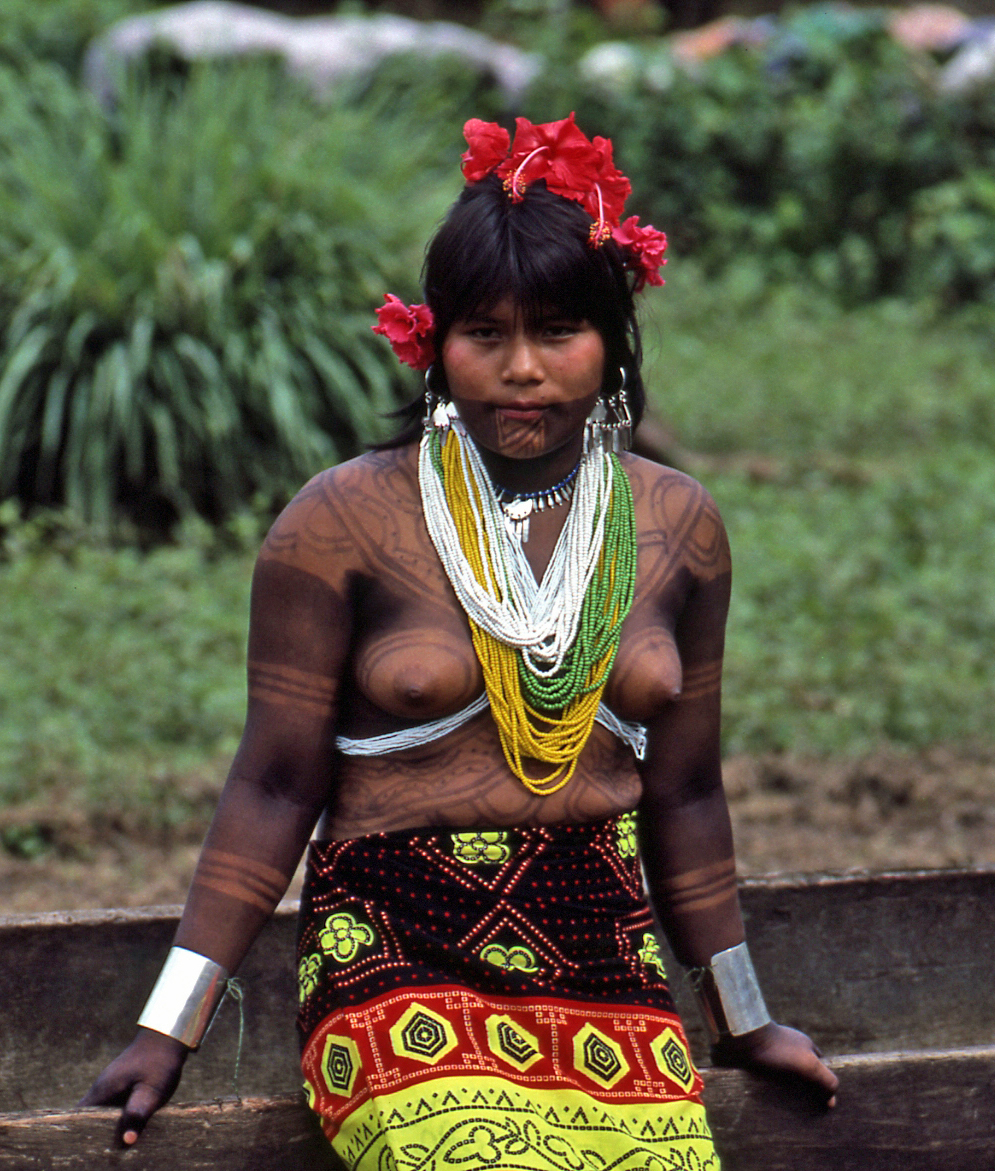
Young Ngöbe-Buglé woman, the largest indigenous community in Panama.

=== Support for the National Indigenous Peoples Development Plan ===
The Support for the National Indigenous Peoples Development Plan was first voted on March 15, 2018, as part of Panamas continuous efforts of increased inclusivity and fairness. The original closing date for this plan is set to be June 30, 2023. The project itself is set to cost an estimated $85.20 million US dollars with a commitment of $80.00 million US dollars made by the World Bank. The goal of this plan is to strengthen the capacity of Indigenous authorities to decide on investments of Indigenous land and resources used by the government. Additionally, the plan is set to aid in the delivery of public services to these indigenous communities. As of December 2019, this plan has an "Overall Implementation Progress (IP)" score of moderately unsatisfactory and a "Progress toward Achievement" score of moderately satisfactory. The implementation process in the year of 2019 has been delayed mainly due to elections and changes in government in Panama, all which began in February 2019. In response, the Indigenous communities of Panama have expressed their need for urgent implementation and demanded the Panamanian government begin implementation before the end of 2019.

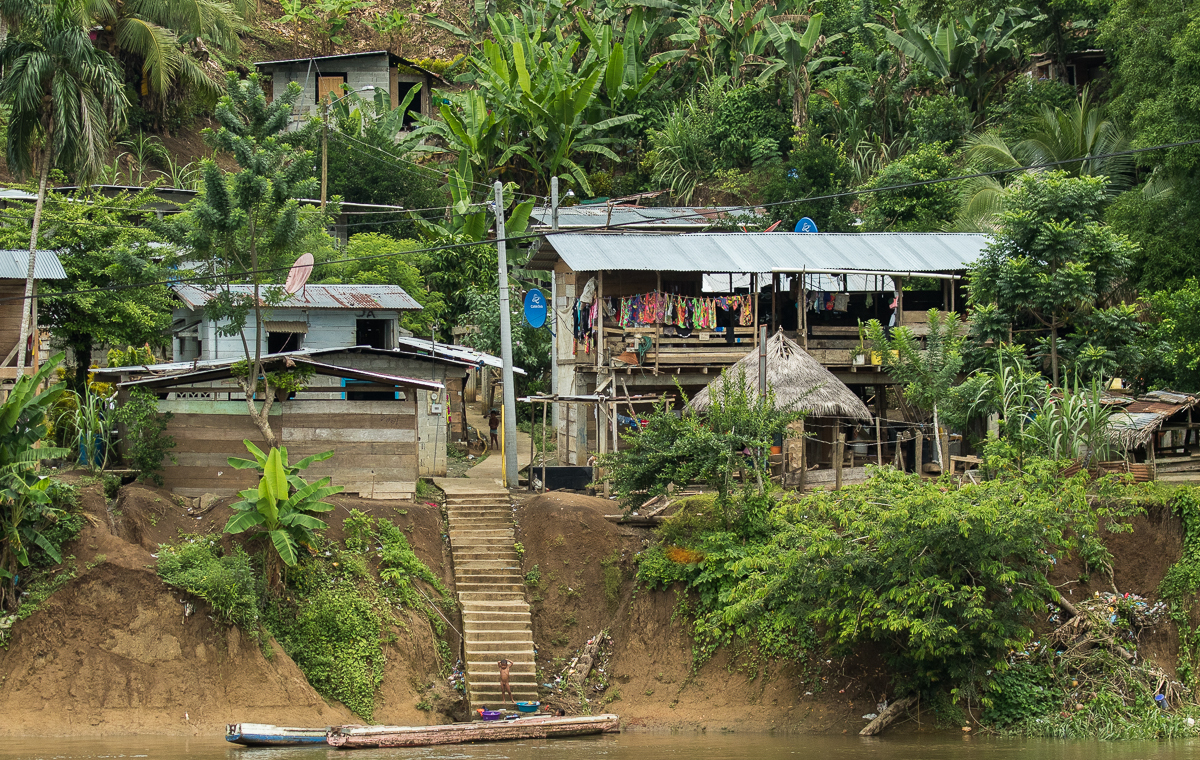
Village along Chucunaque River in Panama.

=== Burunga Wastewater Management Project ===
In their efforts to strengthen shared prosperity in Panama, the Panamanian government, along with the help of the World Bank, approved the Burunga Wastewater Management Project on March 17, 2017. The projected closing date for this project is set to be December 31, 2021. This project is set to cost roughly $81.20 million US dollars, with a commitment of $65.00 million US dollars made by the World Bank. This project is composed of three specific steps: 1) Construction of new sewerage system in the town of Burunga, Panama. 2) development and strengthening of said sewage system to assist surrounding communities, 3) finance management of project and management costs. Each step costing roughly $49.50 US million dollars, $12.70 US million dollars, and $19.00 US million dollars, respectively. According to the World Bank, this project is set to address the serious health risks that arise from the untreated wastewater in Panama. As of now, many Panamanian citizens living in extreme poverties deposit their sewage waste into rivers in their surrounding areas. This leads to significant increases in water-borne illness amongst indigenous and impoverished communities.

=== Basic Education Quality Improvement Project ===
Despite Panamas economic success, the measures of student enrollment, completion and retention differs significantly between urban and indigenous/rural communities. Problems of internal efficiency have been cited as the number one obstacle in Panamas education system, that of which most effects the poor and indigenous. In response, the Panamanian government implemented this project from August 5, 2008, to December 31, 2014. In total, the program cost $42.00 million US dollars, with a commitment amount of $35 million US dollars from the World Bank. The goals of this project were to improve the quality of basic and secondary education programs, increase internal efficiency amongst these programs, and lastly, to enhance the performance and strategic plans of the Ministry of Education (Ministerio de Educacion) in Panama. From 2009 to 2013, enrollment for pre-primary school increased from 62.1% to 70.7%, pre-middle school increased from 85.1% to 97.6%, middle school registration increased from 52.3% to 79.9%, while the overall drop-out rates decreased from 5.1% to 3.1 percent in 2012.

== Results over 10 year periods (1998-2018) ==
The above table was all derived from the official World Bank data archives.

Sector	1998	2008	2018
School enrollment (%; primary education)	104	105	94
Total Population (Mil)	2,912,316	3,516,204	4,176,873
Life expextency at Birth	74	76	78
Poverty incident rate (%)	N/A	33.8	22.1 (2016)
GDP (US Dollars)	$11,575 B	$25,156 B	$65,055 B
CO_{2} emissions (metric tons)	2,042	2,097	2,256 (2014)
