= Columbus University (Panama) =

University in Panama City, Panama

- Motto: "ad infinitum per veritatem" (To the infinite through the truth)
- Type: Private Entity
- Established: October 12, 1992
- Rector: Dr. Carlos A. Arellano Lennox
- Location: Panama City, Panama
- Website: www.columbus.edu

Columbus University is an institution of higher education, established on October 12, 1992. It is authorized by the Panamanian Ministry of Education. It is recognized as a private university, by the Panamanian State, through Executive Decree (in Spanish, Decreto Ejecutivo) No. 112, dated February 25, 1994 and published in the Official Gazette (in Spanish, Gaceta Oficial) No. 22-492 of March 11, 1994.

All its academic programs are approved by the State Universities responsible for its operation: Universidad de Panamá (University of Panama) and Universidad Tecnológica de Panamá (Technological University of Panama).

At present it comprises the following faculties:

- Medicine and Health Sciences
- Administrative Sciences, Economics and Business
- Education Sciences and Linguistics
- Marine Sciences and Technology
- Natural Sciences and Architecture
- Social Sciences and Information Technology
- Law and Political Sciences
