= Latin University of Panama =

Private university in Panama

Coordinates: 9.0278°N 79.5183°W

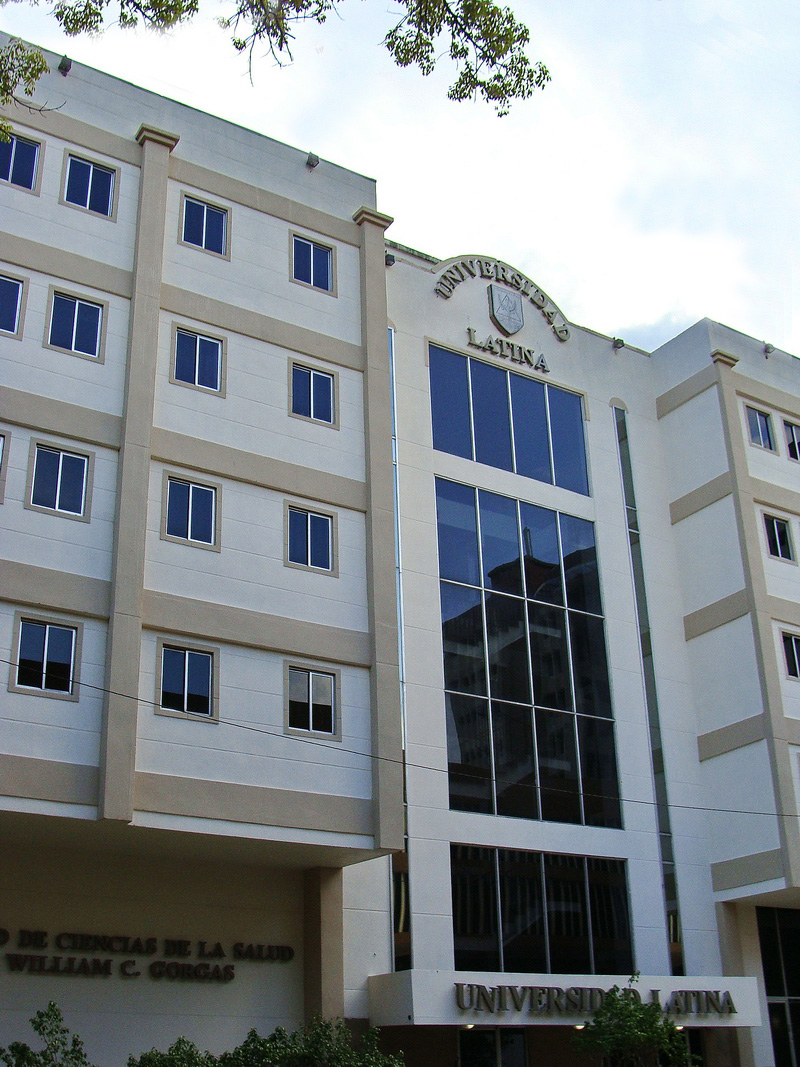
- Universidad Latina de Panamá
- Motto: Summum Desiderium Sapientia
- Type: Private
- Established: 1991
- Rector: Dra. Mirna de Crespo
- Location: Panama City, Panama
- Website: www.ulatina.edu.pa

Latina University of Panama (Universidad Latina de Panamá) is a private university, located in Panama City, Panama. Established in 1991, it is now considered one of the largest private universities in the country.

== History ==
The university has its roots in the Latina University of Costa Rica, established in Paso Canoas, Province of Puntarenas (Costa Rica) in 1989. In Panama it was inaugurated on September 4, 1991, with facilities in Panama City and David, Chiriquí. Two other facilities were later opened in Veraguas and Herrera. The College of Health Sciences was opened on September 26, 1999.

== Academics ==
The university has six faculties:

- Administrative and Economic Sciences
- Computer Sciences and Telecommunications
- Health Sciences
- Communication Sciences
- Education Sciences
- Law and Political Sciences
- Engineering

== Notable alumni ==
- Odette Cortez, dancer and folklorist
- María Cristina Chen Stanziola, judge
