= Ministry of Health (Panama) =

Ministry of the Republic of Panama

- Ministerio de Salud de la República de Panamá
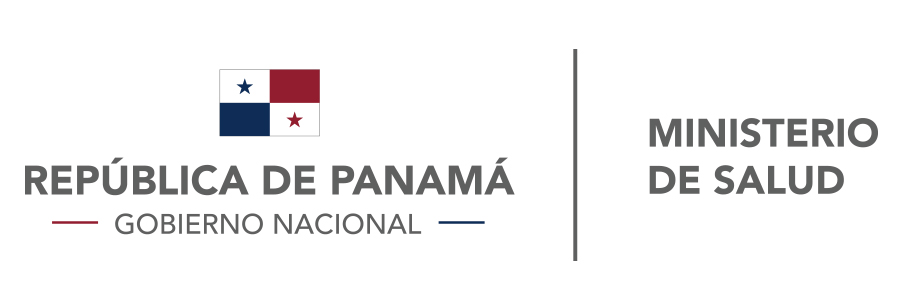

Ministry overview
- Formed: January 15, 1969 (56 years)
- Jurisdiction: Panama
- Headquarters: Gorgas Hospital, Ancón, Panama City, Panama
- Employees: 243 233 (2022)
- Annual budget: B/. 1,904.900 million (2024)
- Deputy Minister responsible: Manuel A. Zambrano Chang
- Ministry executive: Fernando Boyd Galindo; Ivette Odalys Berrío
- Website: http://www.minsa.gob.pa/

The Ministry of Health of Panama (Ministerio de Salud de la República de Panamá, MINSA) is a ministry of the Republic of Panama that is part of the Executive Branch. This institution is responsible for the health and well-being of the Panamanian population and the general health situation of the country. The ministry was created on January 15, 1969 by Cabinet Decree No. 1.

== History ==
The Ministry of Health of Panama has its location or main headquarters in the Gorgas Hospital, in the district of Ancón in the capital of Panama, Panama City. Previously where the current headquarters of the Ministry of Health is, the Gorgas Hospital, was under the jurisdiction of the United States Army for almost the entire 20th century, as part of the Torrijos-Carter Treaties, and later came under the jurisdiction of Panama. Since October 1999, it has been the headquarters of the Ministry of Health.

== Mission ==
The mission of the Ministry of Health of Panama (MINSA) is to guarantee comprehensive access to care for the entire population through public health services, based on the development of management, leadership and transformation functions, in the strategy primary care.

== Health Regions ==
The Ministry of Health of Panama is organized by health regions throughout the Panamanian territory.

Health Region
Metropolitan region
Panama West Region
Panama East Region
North Panama Region
San Miguelito region
Arraiján District Region
Colon Region
Coclé region
Darien Region and Emberá
Veraguas region
Herrera region
Region of the Comarca Kuna Yala
Region of the Comarca Ngabe Buglé
Chiriquí region
Los Santos Region
Bocas del Toro region
