= West Coast University (Panama) =

West Coast University Panama
- Former names: West Coast Institute of Management & Technology (WCIMT)
- Type: Autonomous Educational Institution
- Established: 1996
- President: Sarfraz Lloyd
- Vice-president: M. Kafafy
- Rector: Carlos Gustavo Lavado Roqué
- Registrar: Geoffrey Ong
- Location: Panama City, Panama
- Website: www.westcoastuniversitypanama.online

West Coast University of Panama is a higher education provider based in Panama.

== History ==
The "West Coast Institute of Management & Technology (WCIMT)" was established in 1996 at Perth by a Christian family "S. Lloyd Family Trust" to provide vocational and Professional Educational Services at National and International Levels under a Christian mission and vision of preaching, teaching, and social work. It is an Autonomous Educational Institute and Vocational Training School.

The institute was a registered and accredited training institution, accredited by the Training Accreditation Council (TAC) of the Training Department of the Government of Western Australia, and is listed on the "Commonwealth Register of Institutions and Courses" (CRICOS), which provide accredited courses to local and overseas students up to Graduate Diploma level.

WCIMT established a chain of affiliated colleges in many countries. In 2004, the trustees decided to use this infrastructure to establish the West Coast University in a favorable country. On the recommendations of faculty members, West Coast University was incorporated at Panama City, under article 19 of law 32 of 1927. The phrase "West Coast" has a historical background in Panama. West Coast University, although based in Panama, serves as a global institute for autonomous higher education.

In March 2007, a Bangladesh online newspaper reported that the nation's education ministry and University Grants Commission had found that West Coast University was operating illegally in Bangladesh and the education ministry was seeking to sue the institution for offering bachelor's degree courses without government authorization. Government personnel said that in 2006 West Coast had opened a campus in Khulna, where in February 2007 the school began conducting courses in electrical and electronic engineering, civil engineering, mechanical engineering, and architecture.

In July 2012, an English-language online newspaper for Panama reported that West Coast University was advertising courses to be conducted there, but Panama's National Council of University Assessment and Accreditation (CONEAUPA) and Ministry of Education said the institution was not accredited and they had no record of the institution being legally established or having approved curricula.

As of December 2012, West Coast University is a candidate for accreditation from the Accreditation Council for Business Schools and Programs, for its bachelor's and graduate programs in business.

As of January 2013, West Coast University is now accredited by the International Accreditation Organization (IAO). The IAO is not recognized by the Council for Higher Education Accreditation.
