= Panamanian balboa =

Currency

Balboa panameño (Spanish)
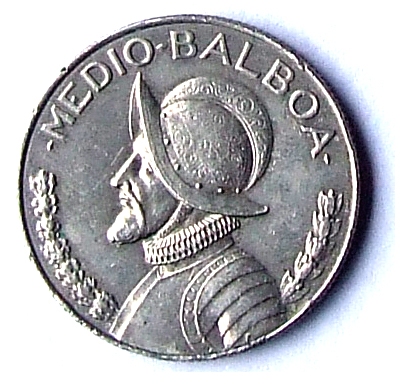
1/2 balboa (front)
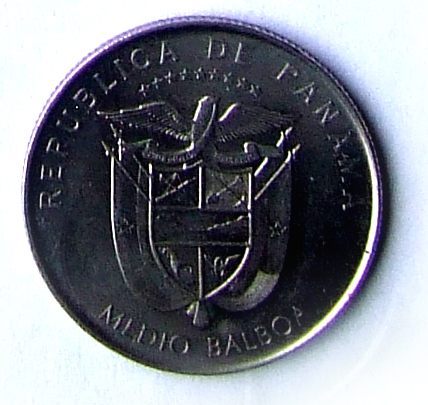
1/2 balboa (back)

ISO 4217
- Code: PAB (numeric: 590)
- Subunit: 0.01

Units of account
- Base unit: balboa
- Symbol: B/. or ฿.
- Subunit
- 1/100: Centésimo

Denominations
- Banknotes: None (U.S. banknotes are employed instead, although denominated in balboas)
- Coins: 1 and 5 centésimos, 1/10, 1/4, 1/2, and 1 balboa

Demographics
- Date of introduction: 1904
- User(s): Panama (alongside the U.S. dollar)

Valuation
- Pegged with: U.S. dollar at par

The balboa (sign: B/.; ISO 4217: PAB) is, along with the United States dollar, one of the official currencies of Panama. It is named in honor of the Spanish explorer and conquistador Vasco Núñez de Balboa. The balboa is subdivided into 100 centésimos.

== History ==
The balboa replaced the Colombian peso in 1904 following the country's independence. The balboa has been tied to the United States dollar (which is also legal tender in Panama) at an exchange rate of 1:1 since its introduction and always circulated alongside dollars.

Panama has never had an official central bank. The National Bank of Panama, one of two government-owned banks, was responsible for nonmonetary aspects of central banking in Panama, assisted by the National Banking Commission (Superintendencia del Mercado de Valores), which was created along with the country's International Financial Center, and was charged with licensing and supervising banks.

== Coins ==
=== Current ===
Denomination	Obverse	Reverse	Diameter	Thickness	Mass	Composition	Edge	Minted
Un centésimo (B/. 0.01)	Urracá	Denomination	19.05 mm	1.55 mm	3.11 g	Copper 95% Tin/Zinc 5%	Smooth	1935–1982
Un centésimo (B/. 0.01)	Urracá	Denomination	19.05 mm	1.55 mm	2.50 g	Copper 2.5% Zinc 97.5%	Smooth	1983–Present
Cinco centésimos de balboa (B/. 0.05)	Denomination	Panamanian Coat of Arms	21.21 mm	1.95 mm	5 g	Copper 25% Nickel 75%	Smooth	1929–Present
Un décimo de balboa (B/. 0.10)	Vasco Núñez de Balboa	Panamanian Coat of Arms	17.91 mm	1.35 mm	2.268g	Copper 91.67% Nickel 8.33%	118 reeds	1966–Present
Un cuarto de balboa (B/. 0.25)	Vasco Núñez de Balboa	Panamanian Coat of Arms	24.26 mm	1.75 mm	5.67g	Copper 91.67% Nickel 8.33%	119 reeds	1966–Present
Medio balboa (B/. 0.50)	Vasco Núñez de Balboa	Panamanian Coat of Arms	30.61 mm	2.15 mm	11.34 g	Copper 91.67% Nickel 8.33%	150 reeds	1973–Present
Un balboa (B/. 1)	Vasco Núñez de Balboa	Liberty with Panamanian Coat of Arms	38.1 mm	2.58 mm	22.68 g	Copper 91.67% Nickel 8.33%	reeded	1973–2010
Un balboa (B/. 1)	Vasco Núñez de Balboa	Panamanian Coat of Arms	26.5 mm	2 mm	7.2 g	Outer ring: Nickel-plated steel Center: Nickel-brass-plated steel	reeded with inscription	2011–Present

=== Obsolete ===
Denomination	Obverse	Reverse	Diameter	Thickness	Mass	Composition	Edge	Minted
Medio Centesimo de Balboa (1/2¢) (No longer used since 1940)	Vasco Núñez de Balboa	Denomination				Copper-nickel	Smooth	1907
Uno y Cuarto Centesimos (1 1/4¢) (No longer used since 1970)	Vasco Núñez de Balboa	Denomination				Copper 95% Tin/Zinc 5%	Smooth	1940
Dos y Medio Centesimos de Balboa (2 1/2¢) (No longer used since 1976)	Vasco Núñez de Balboa	Panamanian Coat of Arms	10 mm		1.25 g	90% Silver, 10% copper	Smooth	1904
Dos y Medio Centesimos de Balboa (2 1/2¢) (No longer used since 1976)	Panamanian Coat of Arms	Denomination	21 mm			Copper-nickel	Smooth	1940
Dos y Medio Centesimos de Balboa (2 1/2¢) (No longer used since 1976)	Vasco Núñez de Balboa	Denomination	18 mm		3.3 g	Copper-nickel	Smooth	1907–1940
Dos y Medio Centesimos de Balboa (2 1/2¢) (No longer used since 1976)	Hand holding stalks of grain	Panamanian Coat of Arms	10 mm			Copper-nickel-plated copper	Smooth	1973–1975
Dos y Medio Centesimos de Balboa (2 1/2¢) (No longer used since 1976)	Victoriano Lorenzo	Panamanian Coat of Arms	10 mm			Copper-nickel-plated copper	Smooth	1975-1985 (proof issues only)

In 1904, silver coins in denominations of 2 1/2, 5, 10, 25, and 50 centésimos were introduced. These coins were weight-related to the 25 gram 50 centésimos, making the 2 1/2 centésimos coin 1.25 grams. Its small size led to it being known as the "Panama pill" or the "Panama pearl". In 1907, copper-nickel 1/2, and 2 1/2 centésimo coins were introduced, followed by copper-nickel 5 centésimo coins in 1929. In 1930, coins for 1/10, 1/4, and 1/2 balboa were introduced, followed by 1 balboa in 1931, which were identical in size and composition to the corresponding U.S. coins. In 1935, bronze 1 centésimo coins were introduced, with 1 1/4 centésimo pieces minted in 1940.

In 1966, Panama followed the U.S. in changing the composition of their silver coins, with copper-nickel-clad 1/10 and 1/4 balboa, and .400 fineness 1/2 balboa. One-balboa coins, at .900 fineness silver, were issued that year for the first time since 1947. In 1973, copper-nickel-clad 1/2 balboa coins were introduced. 1973 also saw the revival of the 2 1/2 centésimos coin, which had a size similar to that of the U.S. half dime, but these were discontinued two years later due to lack of popular demand. In 1983, 1 centésimo coins followed their U.S. counterpart by switching from copper to copper-plated zinc. Further issues of the 1 balboa coins have been made since 1982 in copper-nickel without reducing its size.

Modern 1, 5 centésimo, 1/10, 1/4, and 1/2 balboa coins are the same weight, dimensions, and composition as the U.S. cent, nickel, dime, quarter, and half dollar, respectively. However, U.S. coins are not legal tender in Panama. In 2011, new 1-balboa bimetallic coins were issued that are the same dimensions as the U.S. dollar coin.

In addition to circulating issues, commemorative coins in denominations of 5, 10, 20, 50, 75, 100, 150, 200, and 500 balboas have also been issued. At the time the .925 fineness sterling silver 20 balboa coin honoring Simón Bolívar was introduced in 1971, it was the largest legal tender silver coin in the world, with a 61 mm diameter and containing 3.85 ozt silver.

== Banknotes ==
In 1941, President Arnulfo Arias pushed the government to enact Article 156 to the constitution, authorizing official and private banks to issue paper money. As a result, on 30 September 1941, El Banco Central de Emisión de la República de Panamá (Central Bank of Issue of the Republic of Panama) was established. Arias was deposed in a coup in October and the new banknotes were withdrawn and most destroyed.

U.S. banknotes are legal tender in Panama as the main form of cash in the country.

== Exchange rate ==
Current PAB exchange rates
From Google Finance:	AUD CAD CHF CNY EUR GBP HKD JPY USD
From Yahoo! Finance:	AUD CAD CHF CNY EUR GBP HKD JPY USD
From XE.com:	AUD CAD CHF CNY EUR GBP HKD JPY USD
From OANDA:	AUD CAD CHF CNY EUR GBP HKD JPY USD

== See also ==
- Economy of Panama
