= University of Panama =

University in Panama

Coordinates: 8°59′2″N 79°32′0″W

- Universidad de Panamá
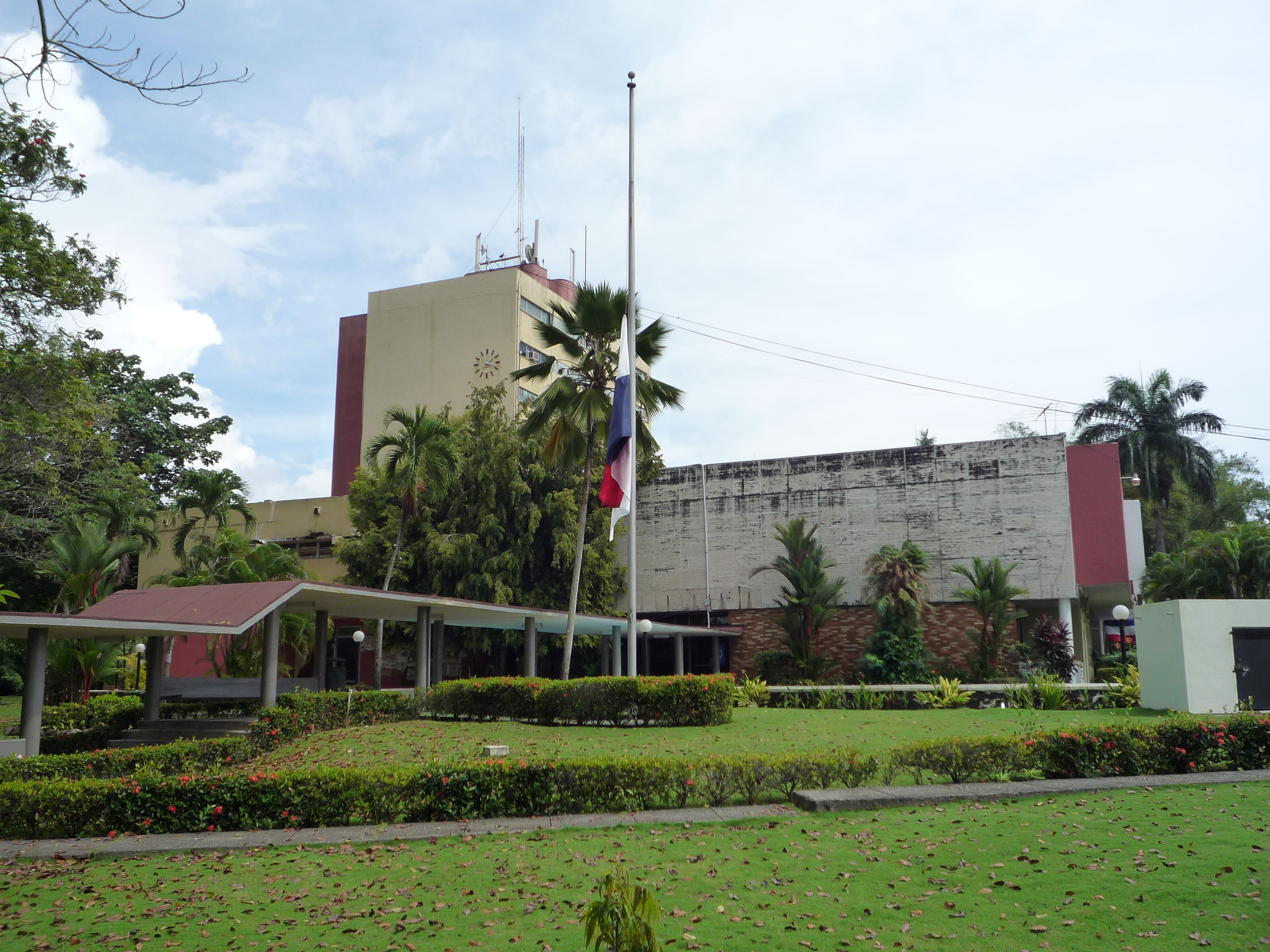
- Motto: Hacia la luz (lit. Towards the light)
- Type: Public
- Established: October 7, 1935; 90 years ago
- Rector: Eduardo Flores Castro
- Location: Vía Simón Bolivar, Panama City, Panama
- Website: www.up.ac.pa

The University of Panama (Spanish: Universidad de Panamá) is a public university in Panama City, Panama. It was founded on October 7, 1935. Initially, it had 175 students learning education, commerce, natural sciences, pharmacy, pre-engineering or law. As of 2008, it had 74,059 students distributed in 228 buildings across the country.

The University of Panama was founded by Octavio Méndez Pereira, who also served as the university's first president.

== History ==
The University of Panama was created by presidential decree on May 29, 1935, during the administration of President Harmodio Arias Madrid. The university began operations on October 7 of the same year in one of the wings of the Instituto Nacional (National Institute). Later on, under the administration of Enrique A. Jiménez, the government purchased around 60 hectares of land in the neighborhood of El Cangrejo, which would eventually become the university's main campus.

Construction began in January 1948 under the supervision of Alberto De Saint Malo, who was the Dean of the Engineering and Architecture Faculty at the time. The first four buildings to be constructed were home to the Humanities, Engineering and Architecture faculties and Science laboratories, and the Administration and Library. Classes in the new buildings began on May 29, 1950. The campus was officially inaugurated on November 1, 1953. In the 1950s, construction continued and 11 additional buildings were built, which would hold the Biochemistry Center, and the Faculties of Pharmacy, and Public Administration and Commerce. In the following decade, 15 more buildings were constructed, among of which house the Odontology and Law Faculties, and the Experimental Center for Agricultural Research in Tocumen.

Between 1970 and 1980, the buildings that were used for Biology, Architecture, Engineering, Humanities (other), the Simón Bolivar Library and Laboratory of Specialized Analysis were finished. At the end of 1979, the University of Panama received the facilities of the Rainbow City High School in Colón, where the first of the university's Regional Centers would begin operations. In the following decade, the Regional Centers for the provinces of Veraguas, Chiriquí and Coclé, and for the region of Azuero were built, including an Agricultural Sciences Faculty in Chiriquí.

In the 1990s, the Regional Center for Panamá Oeste (Western Panama) and four buildings for research were constructed. In 1999, the ARI (Interoceanic Regional Authority), the Panamanian government agency once responsible for the management of the land of the former Panama Canal Zone, transferred the buildings of the former Curundu Junior High School to the University of Panama. This complex would later become the Harmodio Arias Madrid Campus. Other facilities transferred were the ones later used for the Veterinary Hospital, in Corozal. Also during this time, the university expanded its number of buildings by adding 19 more, thanks to the acquisition of adjacent buildings and to the construction of the Regional Center in Bocas del Toro, the extensions of Chepo and Darién, and the popular universities of Azuero and Coclé, today known as Universidades del Trabajo y La Tercera Edad (Universities of Labor and Elders).

On 7 June 2024, two unidentified gunmen fired on a group of six first-year agricultural science students doing field work at the university's rural campus in Veraguas, killing one student and injuring another.

== Achievements ==
Several international research agreements and personnel exchanges have been made by government agencies with the institution. Professors in areas of science and technology, medical health, economics and law have been invited to give keynotes and also teach in other campuses around the world. The University of Panama has also sent representatives to several international congresses and meetings such as Women and Gender, World Economic Forum, environmental congresses, biological research meetings, and statistics congresses.

It is currently positioned at #1 in the best universities in Panama.

== Faculties ==
- Public Administration
- Business Administration
- Architecture
- Fine Arts
- Agricultural Sciences
- Education
- Natural Sciences and Technology
- Communications
- Law and Political Sciences
- Economics
- Nursing
- Pharmacy
- Humanities
- Computer Science, Electronics and Communication
- Medicine
- Veterinary Medicine
- Odontology
- Psychology
- Graphic Design

== Notable faculty ==
- Noris Salazar Allen (born 1947), bryologist
- María Cristina Chen Stanziola, judge
