= World Universities Debating Championship in Spanish =

The World Universities Debating Championship in Spanish (Spanish: Campeonato Mundial Universitario de Debate en Español, CMUDE) is an international university debating competition held in Spanish, staged annually since 2011, It is contested in British Parliamentary format and its host venue rotates among countries of Hispanic America and Spain.

Conceived as the Spanish-language counterpart of the World Universities Debating Championship (WUDC), CMUDE is the Spanish-language university debating tournament with the largest number of participants.

Recent editions have brought together several hundred debaters and adjudicators from more than twenty countries.

== Main format ==
The competition is governed by the official WUDC rules, corresponding to the British Parliamentary format, known as the "World Debate Format" (Formato Mundial de Debate) within the Spanish-speaking circuit. Each debate pits four teams of two speakers against one another, divided between the Opening and Closing halves of the table, arguing for or against a motion announced fifteen minutes in advance.

Each speaker delivers a seven-minute speech, with an additional fifteen seconds of grace, beginning with the Government side and alternating between sides. The speaking order is:

1. Prime Minister (PM) — Opening Government
2. Leader of the Opposition (LO) — Opening Opposition
3. Deputy Prime Minister (DPM) — Opening Government
4. Deputy Leader of the Opposition (DLO) — Opening Opposition
5. Member of Government (MG) — Closing Government
6. Member of the Opposition (MO) — Closing Opposition
7. Government Whip (GW) — Closing Government
8. Opposition Whip (OW) — Closing Opposition

In addition, between the first and the sixth minute, members of the opposing bench may offer points of information to the speaker holding the floor. These are not compulsory, but they are encouraged.

The circuit also maintains a Manual for Adjudicators and Debaters (Manual de Personas Juezas y Debatientes), updated periodically by the adjudication cores, which adapts the WUDC rules to the particularities of the Spanish-speaking sphere.

Following the preliminary rounds, the highest-scoring teams advance to the elimination rounds and on to the grand final, whose winners are awarded the title of world champions of debating in Spanish.

== Parallel competitions ==
Alongside the main competition, other tournaments are held, established on a permanent basis from the Mexico 2014 edition onwards:

- Masters Category, originally called the Nations Cup. A short exhibition tournament contested by experienced debaters and adjudicators. It uses the same format as the main competition, with a greater emphasis on argumentative creativity.
- Speeches Competition, an individual public-speaking event open to all participants, in which rhetorical construction and delivery are given particular weight.

== Host venues ==
Under the circuit's constitution, the host venue is chosen by the World Debate Council (Consejo Mundial de Debate, CMD), on which the countries taking part in previous editions are represented. Bidding candidates present their proposal to the CMD at the edition preceding the one bid for, and the plenary of the Council votes on the following host. The host venues since the first edition have been as follows:

| Edition | Year | Host institution | City | Country |
|---|---|---|---|---|
| I | 2011 | Central University of Venezuela | Caracas | Venezuela |
| II | 2012 | Andrés Bello National University | Santiago | Chile |
| III | 2013 | Complutense University of Madrid | Madrid | Spain |
| IV | 2014 | Monterrey Institute of Technology and Higher Education (State of Mexico Campus) | State of Mexico | Mexico |
| V | 2015 | Universidad del Rosario | Bogotá | Colombia |
| VI | 2016 | University of Córdoba | Córdoba | Spain |
| VII | 2017 | Francisco Marroquín University | Guatemala City | Guatemala |
| VIII | 2018 | Pontifical Catholic University of Valparaíso | Valparaíso | Chile |
| IX | 2019 | ESAN University | Lima | Peru |
| X* | 2020 | Complutense University of Madrid | Online | Spain |
| XI* | 2021 | Escuela Superior Politécnica del Litoral | Online | Ecuador |
| XII | 2022 | King Juan Carlos University | Madrid | Spain |
| XIII | 2023 | Technological University of Panama | Panama City | Panama |
| XIV | 2024 | Pontifical Bolivarian University | Medellín | Colombia |
| XV | 2025 | Universidad del Caribe (UNICARIBE) | Santo Domingo | Dominican Republic |
| XVI | 2026 | Andean University Simón Bolívar | Quito | Ecuador |
| XVII | 2027 | Autonomous University of Barcelona | Barcelona | Spain |

* Editions held online because of the COVID-19 pandemic.

== Past editions and results ==
=== Top teams of each edition (elimination rounds) ===
| Year | Host | Champions | Runners-up | Semi-finalists | Quarter-finalists | Octo-finalists |
|---|---|---|---|---|---|---|
| 2026 | (Ecuador) Andean University Simón Bolívar (Quito) | (Peru) Universidad del Pacífico (VE) Julio César Valverde and Doménica Espinoza [Opening Opposition] | (Spain) University of Barcelona / Autonomous University of Madrid (GT) Andreu Garcia and Pedro Tomás (Spain) Charles III University of Madrid (PR) Giza Fiorella Pavone and Jaime Rodríguez (Mexico) Tec CEM (MS) Mauricio San Román and Javier Márquez | (Colombia) University of Los Andes (CG) Andrés Collantes and Ana González (Mexico) Tec CEM (VV) Aranza Valadez and Manolo Vázquez (Panama) / (Venezuela) Technological University of Panama / Andrés Bello Catholic University (CA) Ana Nari Carrillo and Ellis Alberti (Spain) Francisco de Vitoria University (MF) Álvaro Mora and Álvaro Flores | | |
| 2025 | (Dominican Republic) Universidad del Caribe (Santo Domingo) | Pontifical Catholic University of Peru (FM) Mauricio Jarufe and Fernanda Crousillat [Closing Government] | (Spain) Autonomous University of Barcelona (GG) Andreu Garcia and Luis Felipe Garcia (Spain) Polytechnic University of Valencia (GG) Pau Garcia and Manuel Gámez (Colombia) Universidad del Rosario (TL) Juan Esteban Triviño and Daniela Leyton | (Spain) EUNEIZ (GV) Isabella Vásquez and Amadeo Gavilano (Mexico) Tec CEM (VV) Aranza Valadez and Esteban Valle (Mexico) Tec CEM (VL) Manolo Vazquez and Mauricio San Román (Mexico) National Autonomous University of Mexico (YP) Mariana Yáñez and Brandom Pascual | Pontifical Catholic University of Peru (PC) Fernanda Paz Chávez and Elizabeth Contreras Peña (Belgium) / (France) KU Leuven / Pantheon-Sorbonne University (LB) Pablo Lamiquiz Agius and Matias Blanco (Mexico) Tec CEM (GM) Santiago Gutiérrez Caycedo and Sebastian Montes Rodríguez (Peru) Cayetano Heredia University / Instituto Tecnológico Superior (BZ) Jorge Jean Pierre Bullon Sirumball and Felipe Arturo Zenteno Pacheco (Colombia) National University of Colombia at Medellín (ZC) Manu Zapata and David Cardona Duque (Peru) Pontifical Catholic University of Peru (PC) Roberto Urquieta Yamaguchi and Nicolás Cornejo Ángeles (Spain) / (Italy) Bocconi University / IE University (PR) Diego Rubio and Giza Fiorella Pavone (Spain) University of Málaga / Complutense University of Madrid (BZ) Diego García González and José Luis Muñoz-Reja Rodríguez | (Peru) National University of San Agustín of Arequipa / National University of San Marcos (CC) Allan Chalco and Eduardo Cabrera (Spain) University of Murcia (FP) Nacho Fenollar Portillo and Carmen Puente Nieto (Venezuela) Andrés Bello Catholic University (CO) Valeria Caro and Erikendy Osuna (Spain) University of Barcelona (CS) Flavio Cisneros and Blanca Sánchez-Crespo (Spain) Colegio Mayor Mendel (TR) Ángel Trujillo and Jaime Rodríguez (Peru) University of Lima María Fernanda García and Joaquín Deza (Spain) Francisco de Vitoria University Álvaro Mora and Álvaro Flores (Mexico) Tec CEM (EM) Mariana Elechiguerra and Javier Márquez (Dominican Republic) Universidad Iberoamericana José González and Juliana Martínez (Colombia) National University of Colombia (MD) Cristhian Mora and Alejandra de Felipe (Peru) Universidad del Pacífico Andrea Ramos and Gonzalo Benavides (Peru) Cayetano Heredia University (PC) Iams Cuya and Joaquín Prado (Panama) Technological University of Panama / University of Panama Luis Marval and Angel Arcilla (Spain) Nebrija University Remigio Loma and Jessica Prado (Spain) Polytechnic University of Valencia (MC) Fabian Miulescu and Inés Fernández (Spain) Comillas Pontifical University (FC) Gabriel Casati and Samuel Fernández |
| 2024 | (Colombia) Pontifical Bolivarian University | (Chile) / (United Kingdom) IDS / Pontifical Catholic University of Valparaíso (GS) Marcela Gómez and Mattias Durán [Closing Opposition] | Pontifical Catholic University of Peru (EN) Diego Nuñez and Sebastian Ezeta (Colombia) Universidad del Rosario (ZR) Jessica Zapata and Andres Revelo (Ecuador) / (Peru) Universidad San Francisco de Quito / EID (SG) Angelo Saavedra and Carlo Giron | Pontifical Catholic University of Peru (CG) Fernanda Crousillat and Jorge Godos (Spain) University of Almería / CEU San Pablo University (GC) Jesús Gómez "Capi" and Grego Colao (Colombia) University of Los Andes (OM) Santiago Ortiz and Isabella Mojica (Spain) Colegio Mayor Elías Ahúja (MH) Carlos Montero and Mario de la Hoz | (Spain) Francisco de Vitoria University (MF) Álvaro Mora and Álvaro Flores (Chile) University of Chile (AV) Florencia Atria and Noam Vilches (Peru) Peruvian University of Applied Sciences (CP) Janine Castagnola and Sergio Pérez (Spain) Complutense University of Madrid (PR) Pablo Ponce and Fernanda Roig (Venezuela) Andrés Bello Catholic University (AN) Luis Fernando Narváez and Ellis Alberti (Spain) Polytechnic University of Valencia (GG) Manuel Gámez and Pau García (Colombia) Universidad del Rosario (CS) Laura Cabrera and Laura Sua (Spain) BSE / Leuven (FL) Luis Felipe García and Pablo Lamiquiz | (Peru) / (Spain) César Vallejo University / IFP (MM) Angel Moreno Huaccha and Pablo Martinez (Mexico) Tec CEM (EM) Mariana Elechiguerra and Javier Márquez (Spain) Pompeu Fabra University / Polytechnic University of Catalonia (BG) Ángela Buquet and Bruno Gómez (Venezuela) Central University of Venezuela (PA) Nelson Pernia and Ana Victoria Ascanio (Dominican Republic) Pontificia Universidad Católica Madre y Maestra (RL) Francisco Javier Ricardo Morrobel and Belén Lobo (Spain) Autonomous University of Barcelona (GL) Andreu Garcia and Horacio Lamela (Colombia) National University of Colombia at Medellín (ZC) Manu Zapata and David Cardona Duque (Mexico) UdeG (DV) Josué Torres and Luisa Velázquez (Venezuela) Central University of Venezuela (PR) John Parada and Camila Rivas (Colombia) National University of Colombia (MM) Cristhian Mora and Gabriel Muriel (Mexico) ITAM / El Colegio de México (CK) Zaid Cano and Daniel Kelly (Venezuela) Andrés Bello Catholic University (CV) David Varillas and Camila Carballo (Colombia) Universidad del Rosario (TL) Juan Esteban Triviño and Daniela Leyton (Panama) Technological University of Panama (CD) Ana Nari Carrillo and Emmanuel Domínguez (Mexico) Tec CEM (MV) Lino Mialma and Manolo Vázquez (Peru) Cayetano Heredia University (VM) Nataly Vásquez and Felipe Huerta |
| 2023 | Technological University of Panama | (Spain) International University of Catalonia (VG) Amadeo Gavilano and Isabella Vásquez [Closing Government] | Pontifical Catholic University of Peru (JP) Mauricio Jarufe Caballero and Arianna Pantoja Romero (Spain) Complutense University of Madrid / Sociedad de Debates Complutense (TV) Pedro Tomás and Raúl Viñas (Colombia) Universidad del Rosario (RT) Andrés Revelo and Juan Esteban Triviño | Pontifical Catholic University of Peru (LQ) Joaquín Linares and Andrea Quispe (Mexico) Tec CEM (CM) Natalia García and Benjamín Vigueras (Colombia) National University of Colombia at Medellín (CZ) David Cardona Duque and Manu Zapata Jiménez (Colombia) University of Los Andes (OG) Santiago Ortiz and Carlo Girón | (Mexico) Instituto Tecnológico y de Estudios Superiores de Occidente (CO) Valeria Corona and Tlali Olivarez (Ecuador) Universidad San Francisco de Quito (JM) Arturo Javier Ñamu and Angelo Saavedra (Spain) Autonomous University of Madrid (GO) Juanjo García and Cristina Oñate (Peru) Pontifical Catholic University of Peru (NV) Luis Eduardo Valverde Ramos and Diego Núñez del Prado Velarde (Spain) Colegio Mayor Elías Ahúja Mario de la Hoz and Carlos Montero (Venezuela) Central University of Venezuela (AP) Nelson Pernia and Ana Ascanio (Mexico) Tec CEM (GV) Lino González and Manolo Vázquez (Spain) University of Barcelona (RG) Luis Felipe García and Mark Ripol | (Venezuela) Andrés Bello Catholic University (MN) Diego Maciel and Luis Fernando Narváez (Spain) University of Murcia (PN) Carmen Puente and Ignacio Fenollar (Panama) Universidad Católica Santa María La Antigua (RP) Diego Rubio and Oscar Prado (Peru) National University of San Marcos (MV) Christian Mundaca and Rose Vento (Venezuela) Andrés Bello Catholic University (AT) Ellis Alberti and Beatriz Tirado (Spain) Francisco de Vitoria University (ML) Álvaro Mora and Horacio Lamela (Peru) Pontifical Catholic University of Peru (LB) Tony Barturen and Fabriccio Luna (Peru) Pontifical Catholic University of Peru (VT) Alvaro Torres and Martín Villanueva (Peru) Peruvian University of Applied Sciences (PT) Lexie Tello and Sergio Pérez (Spain) Complutense University of Madrid / Sociedad de Debates Comunícate (ML) José Luis Muñoz and Julio Lozano (Spain) CEU San Pablo (BC) Maider Bernabé and Ceres Calatayud (Mexico) Tec CEM (SR) Mariana Sandoval and Samantha Rivadeneira (Spain) CEU San Pablo (AG) Rocío Alberola and Marta Guerra (Venezuela) Metropolitan University of Caracas (RG) Tomás Romero and Marielena Ginez (Colombia) National University of Colombia (BM) Sebastián Becerra and Cristhian Mora (Spain) Francisco de Vitoria University (FB) Álvaro Flores and Alejandro Baena |
| 2022 | (Spain) King Juan Carlos University | (Mexico) Tec CEM (CM) Natalia García and Benjamín Vigueras [Closing Government] | (Spain) Autonomous University of Barcelona (GV) Amadeo Gavilano and Isabella Vásquez (Peru) Pontifical Catholic University of Peru (MV) Daniela Fernanda Martuccelli and Martín Esteban Villanueva (Spain) Complutense University of Madrid / Sociedad de Debates Complutense (SR) Sonia Khalifa and Raúl Viñas | (Spain) Complutense University of Madrid (RH) Abel Recio and Eduardo H. del Caz (Peru) Pontifical Catholic University of Peru (EL) Joaquín Linares and Sebastián Ezeta (Colombia) National University of Colombia (MM) Christian Mora and Gabriel Ángel Muriel (Peru) Pontifical Catholic University of Peru (NV) Luis Eduardo Valverde Ramos and Diego Núñez del Prado Velarde | Universidad del Rosario (ZR) Andrés Reveló and Jessica Zapata (Mexico) Asteria / University of Guadalajara (VA) Britney Alcántara and Luisa Eleanor Velázquez (Panama) Universidad Católica Santa María La Antigua (LR) Simón Luo and Diego Rubio (Spain) University of Barcelona (GM) Luis Felipe García and Genís Miquel (Spain) Autonomous University of Madrid (GO) Juanjo García and Cristina Oñate (Colombia) National University of Colombia at Medellín (CZ) David Cardona Duque and Manu Zapata Jiménez (Spain) Autonomous University of Barcelona (AH) Dominik Andraš and Pau Hernández (Peru) Pontifical Catholic University of Peru (DG) Matias Durán and Jorge Godos | (Ecuador) Universidad San Francisco de Quito (JM) Arturo Javier Ñamu and Martin Alfonso Luna (Venezuela) Andrés Bello Catholic University (CV) Camila de los Ángeles Carballo and David Alberto Varillas (Colombia) Universidad del Rosario (PL) Carolina Piratoba and Daniela Leyton (Spain) Complutense University of Madrid / Comunícate: Debating Club of the Complutense University of Madrid (RM) Sergio Mateos Martín and Rafael Ruiz de Eguílaz Fernández de Valderrama (Mexico) Instituto Tecnológico y de Estudios Superiores de Occidente (MH) Andrea Martínez and Irais Aránzazu Hernández (Spain) Francisco de Vitoria University (AM) Javier Abellán and Carlota Monedero (Peru) Peruvian University of Applied Sciences (JS) Jayro Luis Fernández and Sergio Rodrigo Pérez (Spain) University of Extremadura / National University of Distance Education (MS) José Luis Muñoz and María Svensson (Spain) Complutense University of Madrid / Sociedad de Debates Complutense (TJ) Pedro Tomás and Teófilo Jiménez (Colombia) Universidad del Rosario (QT) Juan David Quijano and Juan Esteban Triviño (Venezuela) Central University of Venezuela (NA) Nelson Pernia and Ana Ascanio (Spain) Autonomous University of Barcelona (PT) Andrés Touriz and Judit Postigo (Spain) Autonomous University of Madrid (GG) Ignacio García and Jaime García (Spain) University of Salamanca (LR) Javier Lara and Iván Rico (Spain) CEU San Pablo University (GA) Rocío Alberola and Marta Guerra (Mexico) Bates / Instituto Tecnológico y de Estudios Superiores de Occidente (MO) Tlali Sofía Olivárez and Manuel Machorro |
| 2021 | (Ecuador) Escuela Superior Politécnica del Litoral (tournament held online) | Pontifical Catholic University of Peru (JV) Mauricio Jarufe and José Vergara [Opening Opposition] | (Spain) Asturias Debating Club of the University of Oviedo (MR) Alba Morán and Iván Rico (Peru) Pontifical Catholic University of Peru (NQ) Andrea Quispe and Diego Nuñez del Prado Velarde (Peru) National University of San Marcos (RC) Christian Mundaca and Rose Vento | (Ecuador) University of the Armed Forces (ZP) Paulette Parra and Pablo Zúñiga (Colombia) Externado University of Colombia (MO) David Morales and Santiago Ortiz (Spain) National University of Distance Education (SM) Belén Montes and Gorka Samaniego (Colombia) Universidad del Rosario (A) Rafael Cabrera and Martín Bravo | (Colombia) Universidad del Rosario (F) Carolina Barrios and Daniela Leyton (Peru) University of Lima (JN) Stephanía Hidalgo and José Alarcón (Peru) Pontifical Catholic University of Peru (EL) Sebastián Ezeta and Joaquín Linares (Colombia) Universidad del Rosario (C) Lina Cuadros and Juan Angulo (Mexico) Tec CEM (GV) Natalia García and Benjamín Vigueras (Venezuela) Central University of Venezuela (NA) Ana Victoria Ascanio and Nelson Pernía (Mexico) Tec CEM (RP) Samantha Rivadeneira and Jubal Páez (Spain) Francisco de Vitoria University (JC) Carlota Monedero and Javier Abellán | (Panama) Universidad Católica Santa María La Antigua (LR) Diego Rubio and Simón Luo (Mexico) Instituto Tecnológico y de Estudios Superiores de Occidente (MH) Irais Hernández and Andrea Martínez (Ecuador) Universidad San Francisco de Quito (DS) Angelo Saavedra and Adrián Duque (Peru) University of Lima Luis Villa Marquina and Alessandro Girón (Mexico) Instituto Tecnológico y de Estudios Superiores de Occidente (CO) Tlali Sofía Olivárez and Valeria Corona Ramírez (Colombia) Universidad del Rosario (B) Andrés Felipe Revelo Cuéllar and Sebastián Muñoz López (Spain) Autonomous University of Barcelona (BG) Amadeo Gavilano and Judith Bonet Rubio (Venezuela) Metropolitan University (AZ) Roberto Alferrano and Miguel Zambrano (Colombia) Universidad del Rosario (D) Bibiana Ramírez and Jessica Zapata (Colombia) National University of Colombia (RR) Julián Ríos and Esteban Ríos (Mexico) ÁGORA Debate (GR) Gemma Guerrero and Aarón Ramírez Bolaños (Spain) Autonomous University of Barcelona (AH) Pau Hernández del Águila and Dominik Andráš (Colombia) National University of Colombia at Medellín (CZ) David Cardona Duque and Manu Zapata Jiménez (Colombia) National University of Colombia (MM) Gabriel Muriel and Cristhian David Mora Uribe (Venezuela) Metropolitan University (MV) Carlos Vanderdys and Andreína Mendoza (Mexico) Tec CEM (GS) Mariana Sandoval Pérez de Tejada and Lino Kaled González Mialma |
| 2020 | (Spain) Complutense University of Madrid (tournament held online) | Pontifical Catholic University of Peru (JV) Mauricio Jarufe and José Vergara [Closing Opposition] | ; (United Kingdom) Institute of Development Studies – Universidad Iberoamericana Mexico City Marcela Gómez and Tito Ortiz (Mexico) Tec CEM (SV) Benjamín Vigueras and Rubén Sánchez (Chile) Pontifical Catholic University of Valparaíso (DC) Fernando Contreras and Matti Durán | Pontifical Catholic University of Peru (MN) Diego Núñez del Prado and Marcelo Manchego (Mexico) Tec CEM (LS) Lino González and Mariana Sandoval (Peru) Pontifical Catholic University of Peru (GV) Andrés Veramendi and Jorge Godos (Spain) National University of Distance Education (SM) Belén Montes and Gorka Samaniego | Pontifical Catholic University of Peru (CR) Carlos Córdova Guija and Milagros Rodríguez (Ecuador) Universidad San Francisco de Quito (LV) Isabella Vásquez and Martín Luna (Peru) Federico Villarreal National University (JQ) Ademir Jordán and Ayrton Quispe (Colombia) Externado University of Colombia (MM) David Morales and María Mendoza (Colombia) Universidad del Rosario (CA) Juan Angulo and Lina Cuadros (Spain) Asturias Debating Club of the University of Oviedo (MR) Alba Morán and Iván Rico (Peru) Pontifical Catholic University of Peru (LM) Daniela Martuccelli and Joaquín Linares (Colombia) National University of Colombia (MB) Borginny Dussan and Gabriel Muriel | (Ecuador) University of the Armed Forces (ZP) Paulette Parra and Pablo Zúñiga (Peru) National University of San Marcos (MV) Christian Mundaca and Rose Vento (Spain) Autonomous University of Barcelona (GV) Amadeo Gavilano and Luis Enrique Vedia (Colombia) Universidad del Rosario (RZ) Bibiana Ramírez and Jessica Zapata (Peru) University of Piura (AB) Catalina Beatriz Beytía and María Fernanda Ayala (Venezuela) Metropolitan University (GM) Andreina Mendoza and Oriana González (Mexico) Instituto Tecnológico y de Estudios Superiores de Occidente (MH) Andrea Martínez and Iraís Aránzazu Hernández (Peru) National University of San Marcos (GE) Anders Ramos and Rosa Estrella (Colombia) Universidad del Rosario (LR) Andrés Revelo and Daniela Leyton (Peru) Peruvian University of Applied Sciences (CM) Alexis Francois Macedo and Andrea Fernanda Calderón (Mexico) Tec CEM (RP) Jubal Esteban Páez and Samantha Rivadeneira (Peru) Peruvian University of Applied Sciences (PF) Barccia Ximena Falckenheiner and Sergio Rodrigo Pérez (Peru) Universidad del Pacífico (MV) Massimo Rodríguez and Valerie Dube (Peru) University of Piura (BK) Ignacio Barberi and Luis Simón Kusianovich (Ecuador) Universidad San Francisco de Quito (DS) Angelo Saavedra and Adrián Duque (Venezuela) Central University of Venezuela (DV) Catherine Vielma and César Díaz |
| 2019 | (Peru) ESAN University | (Colombia) Universidad del Rosario (HP) Juanita Hincapié and Jorge Portocarrero [Closing Government] | (Spain) King Juan Carlos University (BH) Alejandro Bellanco and Desiré Herrera (Spain) Autonomous University of Madrid (MS) Enrique Marchán and Carmen Sánchez (Colombia) Universidad del Rosario (CD) Hernando Castro and Ana María Díaz | (Peru) , University of Hong Kong (CC) Lucía Cortijo and José Pimentel Santivañez (Spain) University of Barcelona / Autonomous University of Barcelona (RS) Gorka Samaniego and Aleix Ramia (United States) Cornell University (AL) David Alatorre and Brittany García (Mexico) Universidad Iberoamericana Mexico City (GO) Marcela Gómez and Tito Ortiz | (Spain) CEU San Pablo University Elena García-Mayoral and Marta Villa Fernández (Spain) Comillas Pontifical University Elena Gillis and Belén Montes (Chile) Pontifical Catholic University of Chile Fabián Yaksic Muñoz and Eiden Viera (Peru) Pontifical Catholic University of Peru María Fernanda Gómez and Jorge Godos (Spain) Autonomous University of Madrid Isabel Martínez and Verónica Salinas (Spain) Complutense University of Madrid Iván Bejarano Díaz and Manuel T. Fukuda León (Spain) Francisco de Vitoria University Álvaro Reyes and Laura Cardenal (Panama) Universidad Católica Santa María La Antigua Manuel Calvo and Rogelio Paredes | (Colombia) Universidad del Rosario (AO) Juan Roberto Angulo and María Fernanda Orozco (Spain) CEU San Pablo University (SZ) Álvaro Sáez and Carlos Zaera (United States) Cornell University (GS) Aurelio Salas and Leo Grageda (Colombia) Universidad del Rosario (LO) Daniel Alejandro Orobio and Laura Alejandra López (Mexico) Instituto Tecnológico Autónomo de México (RS) Andrea Rincón and Regina Saavedra (Spain) Polytechnic University of Valencia (AM) Anna Asensi and Raúl Diego (Colombia) University of Los Andes (SV) Érika Silva and Santiago Vanegas (Mexico) University of Guadalajara (AB) Daniel Aguilar and Itzcoatl Ilhuicatl Bravo (Spain) Technical University of Madrid (DV) Carlota Delso and Paula Villaseñor (Colombia) Universidad del Rosario (MQ) Juan David Quijano and Sara Paula Mosquera (Mexico) Tec CEM (IM) Mariana Morales and Salma Evelia Infante (Spain) Comillas Pontifical University (BF) Juan Fernández y Zarza and Luis Ignacio Belzuz (Venezuela) Metropolitan University (AP) Enrique Emilio Arriaga and Julio César Pérez (Peru) National University of San Marcos (BC) Isabel Noemi Caballero and Jorge Jean Pierre Bullon (Spain) Colegio Mayor Elías Ahúja (PS) Ignacio Prieto and Javier Sánchez (Peru) Pontifical Catholic University of Peru (ET) José Arturo Tipismana and Omar César Espinoza |
| 2018 | (Chile) Pontifical Catholic University of Valparaíso | (Spain) Fundación Cánovas Cánovas A (Málaga) María García and Carmen Vallecillo [Opening Government] | (Spain) Autonomous University of Madrid (B) Pablo Molins and Carlos Pérez (Colombia) Universidad del Rosario (C) Juanita Hincapié and Jorge Portocarrero (Spain) Comillas Pontifical University ICAI-ICADE (B) Javier Alberite and Luis Ignacio Belzuz | (Spain) Autonomous University of Madrid (A) Juncal León and Enrique Marchán (Spain) Comillas Pontifical University ICAI-ICADE (D) César Yéboles and Álvaro Salazar (Mexico) University of Guadalajara Virtual (A) Tonatiuh Xiuhcoatl Bravo Rosas and José Francisco Salazar Peña (Mexico) University of Guadalajara CUCEA (A) Julio César Aguilar Balderas and Alberto Gutiérrez González | (Spain) Charles III University of Madrid Diego Rubio and Marta Hernani (Spain) CMU Loyola Javier Sánchez and Carmen Sánchez (Spain) ISIPA Ángela Portocarrero and Guillermo Serrano (Mexico) University of Guadalajara CUCSH (A) Itzcoatl Ilhuicatl Bravo Rosas and Daniel Cuauhtli Aguilar Yáñez (Panama) Universidad Católica Santa María La Antigua Manuel Calvo and Rogelio Paredes (Peru) Pontifical Catholic University of Peru PUCP A Judith Condori Sucari and Alexis Hernando | |
| 2017 | Francisco Marroquín University, Guatemala City | (Spain) Comillas Pontifical University ICAI-ICADE (A) Antonio Fabregat and Javier De La Puerta [Opening Government] | (Spain) University of Córdoba Álvaro Ortega and Gonzalo Herreros (Spain) Comillas Pontifical University ICAI-ICADE (B) Javier Alberite and Didier Martín Díaz (Colombia) Universidad del Rosario Ángela Parra Rojas and Paula Ovalle | (Spain) Catholic University of Murcia (UCAM) Marta García and Verónica Salinas (Spain) UMA – CÁNOVAS Beatriz Valcarce Gross and Antonio de la Cruz España (Colombia) Universidad del Rosario Estefany Güechá and Juan Roberto Angulo (United States) Cornell University Leo Grageda and Brittany García | (Mexico) Monterrey Institute of Technology and Higher Education Jubal Páez and Rubén Sánchez Pontifical Catholic University of Peru Karl Palomino and Christian Montero Pontifical Catholic University of Peru José Pimentel and José Carlos Taboada (Colombia) University of Los Andes Federico Martínez and Jeffrey Molina (Spain) SICODI Marta Álvarez and Guillermo Díaz (Peru) National University of San Marcos Hristo Tamayo and Bianca Centeno (Colombia) Pontifical Xavierian University Juan Diego Manrique and Camila Bermúdez (Spain) Francisco de Vitoria University Laura Cardenal and Lucía Quiroga | |
| 2016 | (Spain) University of Córdoba, Córdoba | (Spain) Asociación Gallega de Debate Aída González Vázquez and Atenea Luana Martínez [Opening Government] | (Spain) Autonomous University of Madrid Juncal León and Guillermo Serrano (Mexico) University of Guadalajara Ricardo Acosta and Julio César Aguilar Pontifical Catholic University of Peru Diego Mera and Fernando Tincopa | (Spain) Escuela de Finanzas (Colombia) Universidad del Rosario (Spain) Comillas Pontifical University (Mexico) Monterrey Institute of Technology and Higher Education | (Spain) Comillas Pontifical University (Chile) Andrés Bello National University Noam Vilches and David Hansen (Colombia) Universidad del Rosario (Mexico) ITAM (Spain) Centre for Political and Constitutional Studies Pontifical Catholic University of Peru (Spain) Francisco de Vitoria University (Spain) UGR Asociación Debate Babel Julio Roldán and Javier Aznarte (Spain) University of Córdoba | |
| 2015 | (Colombia) Universidad del Rosario, Bogotá | (Colombia) Universidad del Rosario Santiago Vásquez Rodríguez and Daniel Cardona Caicedo [Closing Government] | Tec de Monterrey, State of Mexico Campus Mariana Morales and Valeria Conde (Spain) Autonomous University of Madrid Irene Miguelsanz Villanueva and Mariella de la Cruz Taboada (Spain) University of Murcia Pilar Rodríguez Losantos and Sergio Melero | (Mexico) Instituto Tecnológico Autónomo de México National University of Colombia Pontifical Catholic University of Peru (Spain) Comillas Pontifical University | Pontifical Catholic University of Peru (Colombia) University of Medellín (x2) (Spain) University of Córdoba (Mexico) University of Guadalajara CUCSH (Colombia) Universidad del Rosario National University of Colombia (Colombia) University of Tolima | |
| 2014 | (Mexico) Monterrey Institute of Technology and Higher Education, Atizapán de Zaragoza | (Colombia) Universidad del Rosario Arturo Vallejo Abdala and Daniel Cardona Caicedo [Opening Government] | (Spain) University of Córdoba Gonzalo Herreros Moya and Jorge Lucena Pérez (Spain) Autonomous University of Madrid Irene Miguelsanz Villanueva and Javier Moreta Llovet (Spain) Comillas Pontifical University Antonio Fabregat and Alberto de Unzurrunzaga Rubio | (Colombia) Universidad del Rosario (Spain) University of Murcia (Colombia) University of Tolima (Spain) University of Córdoba – CDU Debating Club | Pontifical Catholic University of Peru University of Chile National University of Colombia at Medellín National University of Colombia (x2) (Chile) Andrés Bello National University (Colombia) Universidad del Rosario (Mexico) University of Guadalajara | |
| 2013 | (Spain) Complutense University of Madrid, Madrid | (Chile) Andrés Bello National University Ricardo Gómez and Nicole Hansen [Opening Opposition] | (Spain) Francisco de Vitoria University David Ferrete Camarzana and Jorge Whyte García Central University of Venezuela María Gabriela Vincent Allende and Andrés Ávila (Spain) University of Extremadura Carlos Seseña and Gonzalo Alonso Pinto | Tec de Monterrey, State of Mexico Campus (Colombia) Universidad del Rosario (x2) Central University of Venezuela | Central University of Venezuela (x2) University of Chile National University of Colombia (Colombia) Universidad del Rosario (Spain) University of Santiago de Compostela Simón Caaveiro Fraga and F. Adrián Fernández Tojo (Chile) Chilean Air Force Natalia Sanhueza Medina and Danissa Guzmán Santis (Chile) Universidad Santo Tomás Viña del Mar | |
| 2012 | (Chile) Andrés Bello National University, Santiago | University of Chile Santiago Daniel Iribarren Abarca and Nicolás Palma [Closing Government] | (Chile) Pontifical Catholic University of Valparaíso César Miranda Reyes and José Meza Tec de Monterrey, State of Mexico Campus David Alatorre López and Rodolfo Flores Méndez Tec de Monterrey, State of Mexico Campus José Alberto Ramírez and Valeria García | (Chile) Andrés Bello National University (x2) (Colombia) Universidad del Rosario (x2) | Pontifical Catholic University of Peru (Chile) Federico Santa María Technical University (Chile) Andrés Bello National University Central University of Venezuela (Chile) University of the Andes (x2) Pontifical Catholic University of Chile (Chile) Universidad del Desarrollo | |
| 2011 | Central University of Venezuela, Caracas | (Venezuela) Simón Bolívar University Jesús Gorrín and Alain Herrera [Closing Government] | (Chile) Andrés Bello National University Nicole Hansen and Marcelo Rivera Central University of Venezuela Howard Ávarez and Rafael Bullones (Colombia) Universidad del Rosario Ingrid Rodríguez and Luisa Salazar | San Sebastián University University of Chile (Colombia) Universidad del Rosario Central University of Venezuela | National University of Colombia Central University of Venezuela (x4) (Mexico) Monterrey Institute of Technology and Higher Education (Colombia) Universidad del Rosario (Spain) Complutense University of Madrid | |

=== Best speakers ===
| Year | Host | Best speaker | Second place | Third place | Fourth and fifth places | Sixth to tenth places |
|---|---|---|---|---|---|---|
| 2026 | (Ecuador) Andean University Simón Bolívar (Quito) | (Spain) Andreu Garcia (Spain) Pedro Tomás | Tie for first place; ranking continues directly at third. | (Spain) Jesús Gómez "Capi" | (Venezuela) Ellis Alberti (Spain) Jaime Rodríguez (Spain) Giza Pavone (Mexico) Aranza Valadez | (Peru) Gonzalo Benavides (Spain) Álvaro Mora (Spain) Álvaro Flores (Peru) Christian Mundaca (Mexico) Manolo Vázquez |
| 2025 | (Dominican Republic) Universidad del Caribe (Santo Domingo) | (Peru) Fernanda Crousillat | (Peru) Mauricio Jarufe | (Spain) Andreu Garcia | (Spain) Amadeo Gavilano (Peru) Jorge Jean Pierre Bullon Sirumball (Peru) Felipe Arturo Zenteno Pacheco (Spain) Luis Felipe Garcia | (Colombia) Juan Esteban Triviño (Spain) José Luis Muñoz-Reja Rodríguez (Colombia) Daniela Leyton Giraldo |
| 2024 | (Colombia) Pontifical Bolivarian University | (Colombia) Universidad del Rosario Jessica Zapata | (United Kingdom) IDS Marcela Gómez Valdés | (Chile) Pontifical Catholic University of Valparaíso Mattias Durán Santis | Pontifical Catholic University of Peru Fernanda Crousillat Rayter (Colombia) Universidad del Rosario Andrés Revelo | Pontifical Catholic University of Peru Jorge Godos (Spain) UAL / CEU Grego Colao Fonseca Central University of Venezuela Ana Victoria Ascanio Abreu (Spain) UAL / CEU Jesús Gómez "Capi" National University of Colombia at Medellín Manu Zapata Jiménez (Spain) Autonomous University of Barcelona Andreu Garcia Raurell (Colombia) University of Los Andes Santiago Ortiz García |
| 2023 | Technological University of Panama | Pontifical Catholic University of Peru Mauricio Jarufe | (Spain) International University of Catalonia Amadeo Gavilano | (Spain) Complutense University of Madrid Raúl Viñas | (Spain) International University of Catalonia Isabella Vásquez (Spain) Complutense University of Madrid Pedro Tomás (Spain) University of Barcelona Luis Felipe García | (Mexico) Tec CEM Benjamin Vigueras (Colombia) University of Los Andes Santiago Ortiz Pontifical Catholic University of Peru Arianna Pantoja (Mexico) Tec CEM Natalia García (Spain) Complutense University of Madrid José Luis Muñoz |
| 2022 | (Spain) King Juan Carlos University | (Chile) Pontifical Catholic University of Valparaíso Mattias Durán Santis | Pontifical Catholic University of Peru Jorge Godos Ortiz | (Spain) Complutense University of Madrid Raúl Viñas | (Spain) Complutense University of Madrid Abel Recio (Colombia) Universidad del Rosario Jessica Zapata (Spain) University of Salamanca Javier Lara (Spain) Complutense University of Madrid Sonia Khalifa | (Mexico) Tec CEM Benjamín Vigueras Pontifical Catholic University of Peru Diego Núñez del Prado Pontifical Catholic University of Peru Joaquín Linares (Spain) University of Salamanca Iván Rico (Panama) Universidad Católica Santa María La Antigua (LR) Simón Luo |
| 2021 | (Ecuador) Escuela Superior Politécnica del Litoral, Guayaquil | Pontifical Catholic University of Peru Mauricio Jarufe | Pontifical Catholic University of Peru José Francisco Vergara | (Ecuador) Universidad San Francisco de Quito Adrián Duque | (Spain) National University of Distance Education Gorka Samaniego (Colombia) Universidad del Rosario Jessica Zapata | (Colombia) Universidad del Rosario Bibiana Ramírez (Spain) National University of Distance Education Belén Montes (Peru) Pontifical Catholic University of Peru Sebastián Ezeta (Ecuador) University of the Armed Forces Paulette Parra (Ecuador) University of the Armed Forces Pablo Zúñiga |
| 2020–2021 | (Spain) Complutense University of Madrid | Universidad Iberoamericana Mexico City Tito Samuel Ortiz | (United Kingdom) Institute of Development Studies Marcela Goméz | (Mexico) Monterrey Institute of Technology and Higher Education Rubén Sánchez | Pontifical Catholic University of Peru Mauricio Jarufe Pontifical Catholic University of Peru José Francisco Vergara | (Mexico) Monterrey Institute of Technology and Higher Education Benjamín Vigueras (Chile) Pontifical Catholic University of Valparaíso Mattias Durán Santis (Spain) National University of Distance Education Gorka Samaniego (Spain) National University of Distance Education Belén Montes (Chile) Pontifical Catholic University of Valparaíso Fernando Contreras González |
| 2019 | (Peru) ESAN University, Lima | (Colombia) Universidad del Rosario Juanita Hincapié | (Colombia) Universidad del Rosario Jorge Portocarrero | (Spain) Comillas Pontifical University Elena Gillis (Spain) Autonomous University of Barcelona Gorka Samaniego | (Spain) Comillas Pontifical University Belén Montes (Spain) Autonomous University of Madrid Carmen Sánchez (Spain) Colegio Mayor Elías Ahúja Ignacio Prieto (Mexico) ITAM Andrea Rincón | (Colombia) Universidad del Rosario Daniel Orobio Pontifical Catholic University of Peru José Arturo Tipismana Arriola |
| 2018 | (Chile) Pontifical Catholic University of Valparaíso, Valparaíso | (Spain) Comillas Pontifical University Antonio Fabregat | (Spain) Comillas Pontifical University Javier de la Puerta | (Spain) ISIPA Guillermo Serrano (Spain) CEU San Pablo University Jorge Álvarez Palomino | | |
| 2017 | Francisco Marroquín University, Guatemala City | (Spain) Escuela de Finanzas Aída González | (Spain) Escuela de Finanzas Iván Olmos Ferreiro (Spain) Comillas Pontifical University Javier Alberite | Tie for second place; ranking continues directly at fourth. | (Mexico) Asociación Mexicana de Cultura y Debate Valeria Hernández (Spain) Comillas Pontifical University Antonio Fabregat (Spain) Comillas Pontifical University Didier Martín Díaz | (Mexico) Escuela Libre de Derecho Sergio Luna (Mexico) University of Guadalajara Julio César Aguilar (Spain) Autonomous University of Madrid Juncal León (Spain) Francisco de Vitoria University Yolanda González (Spain) Complutense University of Madrid Víctor Corpa (Spain) Comillas Pontifical University Javier de la Puerta |
| 2016 | (Spain) University of Córdoba | (Spain) Comillas Pontifical University Antonio Fabregat | (Spain) Centre for Political and Constitutional Studies Irene Miguelsanz Villanueva | (Spain) Comillas Pontifical University Javier de la Puerta | (Spain) University of Córdoba Natalia Gascón (Spain) Centre for Political and Constitutional Studies Jorge Lucena | (Spain) Comillas Pontifical University Javier Alberite (Spain) Comillas Pontifical University Esteban Bueno (Spain) University of Córdoba José Villar (Mexico) ITAM Carlos Ortega (Colombia) Universidad del Rosario Nathalia Isaza |
| 2015 | (Colombia) Universidad del Rosario, Bogotá | (Spain) Comillas Pontifical University Antonio Fabregat | (Spain) Comillas Pontifical University Alberto de Unzurrunzaga Rubio (Spain) University of Murcia Pilar Rodríguez Losantos | (Spain) Autonomous University of Madrid Irene Miguelsanz Villanueva | (Spain) University of Murcia Sergio Melero (Colombia) Universidad del Rosario Diego Duarte | (Chile) Federico Santa María Technical University Carlos Fernández (Colombia) Universidad del Rosario Daniel Cardona (Spain) University of Córdoba Gonzalo Herreros Moya (Colombia) Universidad del Rosario Santiago Vásquez (Colombia) Universidad del Rosario Nathalia Isaza (Spain) University of Córdoba Carlos Valverde |
| 2014 | (Mexico) Monterrey Institute of Technology and Higher Education, Atizapán de Zaragoza | (Spain) University of Extremadura Gonzalo Alonso Pinto | (Spain) University of Extremadura Carlos Seseña Vaquero | (Chile) Andrés Bello National University Fernando Vera | | |
| 2013 | (Spain) Universidad Complutense, Madrid | Central University of Venezuela María Gabriela Vicent Allende | (Spain) University of Extremadura Carlos Seseña Vaquero | (Chile) Andrés Bello National University Ricardo Gómez | (Chile) Andrés Bello National University Nicole Hansen (Colombia) Universidad del Rosario Carlos Parra | (Spain) University of Extremadura Gonzalo Alonso (Colombia) Universidad del Rosario Ana María Díez Defex Central University of Venezuela Andrés Ávila (Spain) University of Córdoba Carlos Valverde (Spain) University of Córdoba Guillermo Díaz |
| 2012 | (Chile) Andrés Bello National University, Santiago | University of Chile Daniel Iribarren Abarca | Central University of Venezuela Rita Sleiman | University of Chile Nicolás Palma | (Chile) Andrés Bello National University Nicole Hansen (Chile) Andrés Bello National University Fernando Vera | Pontifical Catholic University of Chile Valentina Salvatierra Pontifical Catholic University of Chile Paulina Valenzuela ITESM State of Mexico Campus David Alatorre López ITESM State of Mexico Campus Rodolfo Flores (Chile) Andrés Bello National University Constanza Díaz |
| 2011 | Central University of Venezuela, Caracas | (Spain) Complutense University of Madrid Camila Salazar-Simpson | (Chile) Andrés Bello National University Nicole Hansen ITESM State of Mexico Campus David Alatorre López | Tie for second place; ranking continues directly at fourth. | (Chile) San Sebastián University Boris Márquez (Spain) Complutense University of Madrid Darío Jiménez | University of Chile Daniel Iribarren Central University of Venezuela Beverly Fung Mock (Chile) Andrés Bello National University Marcelo Rivera Central University of Venezuela Rita Sleiman Central University of Venezuela Howard Álvarez |

=== Alfred Snider Award ===
This award is given to the best team from an institution taking part in the championship for the first time. It has been awarded since CMUDE 2018.

| Year | Host | Team recognised | Ranking position | Team points | Total speaker points |
|---|---|---|---|---|---|
| 2026 | (Ecuador) Andean University Simón Bolívar (Quito) | Universitat de València Nicolás Moreno and Pau Chaume | Break 27 | 15 team points | 1409 speaker points |
| 2025 | (Dominican Republic) Universidad del Caribe (Santo Domingo) | Autonomous University of Central America Daniel Castañeda and Samantha Cruz | No break | 9 team points | 1308 speaker points |
| 2024 | (Colombia) Pontifical Bolivarian University | University of La Sabana Valeria Pinzón Niño and Daniel Reyes Tobar | No break | 16 team points | 1383 speaker points |
| 2023 | Technological University of Panama | Brown University Marcelo Rodríguez and Toby James Arment | No break | 12 team points | 1374 speaker points |
| 2022 | (Spain) King Juan Carlos University | Not awarded | | | |
| 2021 | (Ecuador) Escuela Superior Politécnica del Litoral, Guayaquil | National University of Trujillo Lorena Ticlia Quispe and María Vásquez Correa | No break | 16 team points | 1354 speaker points |
| 2020–2021 | (Spain) Complutense University of Madrid, Madrid | Asturias Debating Club of the University of Oviedo Alba Morán Álvarez and Iván Rico González | Break 16 | 17 team points | 1385 speaker points |
| 2019 | (Peru) ESAN University, Lima | Icesi University Iván Jacho Flórez and José Villegas García | No break | 14 team points | 1357 speaker points |
| 2018 | (Chile) Pontifical Catholic University of Valparaíso, Valparaíso | University of Valparaíso Fernando Contreras and David Muñoz Universidad de las Américas Puebla Marcela Gómez and Alejandra Graham | Break 5th Break 27 | 20 team points 17 team points | 1364 speaker points 1315 speaker points |

=== Best adjudicator ===
| Year | Host | Adjudicator recognised |
|---|---|---|
| 2026 | (Ecuador) Andean University Simón Bolívar (Quito) | (Ecuador) Adrián Duque (Peru) Jorge Godos |
| 2025 | (Dominican Republic) Universidad del Caribe (Santo Domingo) | (Colombia) Juanita Hincapié Restrepo |
| 2024 | (Colombia) Pontifical Bolivarian University | (Colombia) Juanita Hincapié Restrepo |
| 2023 | Technological University of Panama | (Chile) Fabián Yaksic Muñoz |
| 2022 | (Spain) King Juan Carlos University | (Mexico) Rubén Sánchez |
| 2021 | (Ecuador) Escuela Superior Politécnica del Litoral | (Colombia) Juanita Hincapié Restrepo |
| 2020–2021 | (Spain) Complutense University of Madrid | (Chile) Fabián Yaksic Muñoz |
| 2019 | (Peru) ESAN University | (Spain) Juncal León |
| 2018 | (Chile) Pontifical Catholic University of Valparaíso | (Curaçao) Nathania Engelhardt |
| 2017 | (Guatemala) Francisco Marroquín University | (Spain) Carlos Seseña |

== All-time ranking ==
| Country | Champion | Finalist | Semi-finalist | Quarter-finalist | Best position achieved | Best speaker position |
|---|---|---|---|---|---|---|
| Spain | 4 | 22 | 15 | 19 | 1st | 1st |
| Peru | 4 | 8 | 8 | 17 | 1st | 1st |
| Colombia | 3 | 6 | 15 | 17 | 1st | 1st |
| Chile | 3 | 3 | 4 | 12 | 1st | 1st |
| Mexico | 2 | 7 | 12 | 9 | 1st | 1st |
| Venezuela | 1 | 2 | 2 | 9 | 1st | 1st |
| Ecuador | 0 | 1 | 1 | 3 | 3rd | 3rd |
| Panama | 0 | 0 | 1 | 3 | 3rd | 10th |
| Dominican Republic | 0 | 0 | 0 | 1 | 17th | 61st |
| Guatemala | 0 | 0 | 0 | 0 | 17th | 95th |
| United States | 0 | 0 | 2 | 0 | 26th | 38th |
| Costa Rica | 0 | 0 | 0 | 0 | 39th | 67th |
| El Salvador | 0 | 0 | 0 | 0 | 43rd | 47th |
| Netherlands | 0 | 0 | 0 | 0 | 68th | None |
| Russia | 0 | 0 | 0 | 0 | 82nd | 150th |
| Romania | 0 | 0 | 0 | 0 | None | 125th |
| Germany | 0 | 0 | 0 | 0 | None | 143rd |

== Side competitions ==
=== Masters Cup (formerly Nations Cup and Adjudicators' Cup) ===
| Year | Host | Champions | Runners-up | Semi-finalists | Quarter-finalists |
|---|---|---|---|---|---|
| 2025 | (Dominican Republic) Universidad del Caribe (Santo Domingo) | (Ecuador) & (Venezuela) Adrián Duque, Angelo Saavedra and Ellis Alberti | (Chile) & (Mexico) Fernando Contreras, Natalia García and Manolo Vásquez | (Spain) & (Mexico) Marce Gómez, Pedro Tomás and Aranza Valadez (Spain) & (Peru) Gonzalo Benavides, Pablo Ponce Sánchez and Christian Mundaca | (Peru) Mauricio Jarufe, Omar Espinoza and Martín Villanueva (Peru) Lucía Raffo, Diego Cabrera and Joaquín Deza (Peru) Luis Valverde, Diego Núñez del Prado and Sebastián Ezeta (Mexico) & (Peru) Jorge Bullon, Britney Alcántara and María Fernanda Ayala |
| 2024 | (Colombia) Pontifical Bolivarian University | (Spain) & (United Kingdom) Iván Rico, Amparo Perucho and Bethany Garry | (Colombia) Diego Duarte, Catalina Rodríguez and Valeria Morales | (Mexico) & (Peru) Valeria Corona, David Morales and Diego Núñez (Mexico) & (Spain) Benjamín Vigueras, Pedro Tomás and Mateo Cruzatt | (Peru) Jorge Godos, Gerson Oviedo and Fernanda Paz (Peru) (Ecuador) & (Colombia) Martín Luna, Alelí Chaparro and Kazhia Fernández (Ecuador) & (Panama) Angelo Saavedra, Adrián Duque and Diego Rubio (Venezuela) David Varillas, María Isabel Landaeta and Sandra Cova |
| 2023 | Technological University of Panama | (Peru) , (Ecuador) & (Chile) Angel Moreno, Adrián Duque and Fabián Yaksic | (Mexico) , (Spain) & (Chile) Marcela Gómez, Amparo Perucho and Fernando Contreras | (Colombia) & (Peru) Juan Navarro, Diego Duarte and Jorge Godos (Mexico) & (Peru) Luisa Velázquez, Jorge Bullón and Stephania Hidalgo | No break to quarter-finals |
| 2022 | (Spain) King Juan Carlos University | (Scotland) , (Ecuador) & (Chile) Bethany Garry, Paulette Parra and Fabián Yaksic | (Mexico) & (Spain) Rubén Sánchez, Marcela Gómez and Amparo Perucho | (Spain) Javier Sánchez Villegas, Tomeu Vera and María García Ribeiro (Mexico) , (Ecuador) & (Chile) Valeria Corona, Adrián Duque and Fernando Contreras | No break to quarter-finals |
| 2021 (Masters Cup) | (Ecuador) Escuela Superior Politécnica del Litoral | (Colombia) & (Peru) Manuela Posada, Lia Macana and Francois Macedo | (Mexico) , (Spain) & (Chile) Marcela Gómez, Amparo Perucho and Fernando Contreras | No break to semi-finals | No break to quarter-finals |
| 2020–21 (Masters Cup) | (Spain) Complutense University of Madrid | (Colombia) & (Panama) Diego Duarte, Giza Fiorella Pavone and Juanita Hincapié | (Peru) & (Brazil) Jorge Bullón, Giovanni Begossi and Adriana Barrantes | (Peru) & (Chile) Sebastián Ezeta, Fabián Yaksic and Fernanda Crousillat (Colombia) & (Mexico) Érika Silva, Valeria Hernández and Daniel Espinosa | No break to quarter-finals |
| 2019 (Masters Cup) | (Peru) ESAN University, Lima | (Spain) Jorge Álvarez Palomino, Víctor Corpa Rubio and Iñigo Vallejo | (Spain) | (Spain) Mixed team (Mexico) (Spain) (Chile) | No break to quarter-finals |
| 2018 (Nations Cup) | Pontifical Catholic University of Valparaíso, Chile | (Mexico) Valeria Hernández, Mariana Morales, David Alatorre López | (Spain) Gonzalo Herreros, Aída González, Francisco Valiente | North America ( (United States) & (Mexico) ) Carlos Ortega, Roberto Romeu, Oliver Leung (Colombia) | No break to quarter-finals |
| 2017 | Francisco Marroquín University, Guatemala City | (Colombia) Juan Martín Londoño, Nicolás Bermúdez Pitta and Ginary Gutiérrez | (Ecuador) (Colombia) Ricardo López, Sergio Carvajal and Julián Duarte | (Peru) (Colombia) Luisa Salazar (Mexico) David Alatorre López, Salma Infante Osorio | (Mexico) (Spain) (Colombia) |
| 2016 | (Spain) University of Córdoba, Córdoba | (Spain) Cristina Guerrero, Jorge Whyte, Jaime de la Virgen and Alberto Buscató | (Mexico) David Alatorre López, Nicholas Ferezin, Alfredo Díaz Barriga, (Chile) Nicole Hansen | (Spain) Iñigo Vallejo Achón, Daniel Quijano Ramos and Javier López Padilla | |
| 2015 | (Colombia) Universidad del Rosario, Bogotá | (Spain) Francisco Valiente, Cristina Guerrero, Jorge Whyte and Manuel Paredes | (Chile) | (Colombia) (Peru) | (Mexico) (Panama) |
| 2014 | Tec, State of Mexico Campus, Atizapán de Zaragoza | (Peru) Erika Martínez, Erika Rodríguez, Magaly Anco | (Chile) Marcelo Rivera, Katerin López, Jorge Albornoz | (Colombia) Ana María Diez, Christian Mora and Ramón Salazar Central America | (Mexico) Mixed team |

=== Spanish as a second language ===
| Year | Host | Champions | Finalists |
|---|---|---|---|
| 2025 | (Dominican Republic) Universidad del Caribe (Santo Domingo) | No ESL category held | |
| 2024 | (Colombia) Pontifical Bolivarian University | No ESL category held | |
| 2023 | Technological University of Panama | No ESL category held | |
| 2022 | (Spain) King Juan Carlos University | No ESL category held | |
| 2021 | (Ecuador) Escuela Superior Politécnica del Litoral | No ESL category held | |
| 2020 | (Spain) Complutense University of Madrid | No ESL category held | |
| 2019 | (Peru) ESAN University, Lima | (United States) Cornell University Luz Dybner and Sara Stober | (United States) Colgate University |
| 2018 | Pontifical Catholic University of Valparaíso, Chile | (United States) Cornell University Brittany Garcia and Estefanía Palacios | (United States) Cornell University University of La Verne University of North Georgia |
| 2017 | Francisco Marroquín University, Guatemala | (United States) University of Denver Selene Figueroa and Quinn Seremet | |
| 2016 | (Spain) University of Córdoba, Córdoba | (Germany) TU Munich (England) Warwick Reinhold Koch and (Austria) Katrin Fallmann | (United States) University of Denver (Russia) HSE (Netherlands) Wageningen University and Research |
| 2015 | (Colombia) Universidad del Rosario, Bogotá | (Netherlands) Maastricht University (Germany) Felix Plassman and Alexander Wisse | (United States) Colgate University (x2) Economy University of Russia |
| 2014 | Tec de Monterrey, State of Mexico Campus, Atizapán de Zaragoza | (United States) Willamette University (Mexico) Shamir Cervantes and (United States) Andrés Oswill | (United States) Colgate University (x3) |

=== Speeches competition ===
| Year | Host | Champion | Finalists |
|---|---|---|---|
| 2026 | (Ecuador) Andean University Simón Bolívar (Quito) | Pedro Tomás (Spain) | Daniela Leyton (2nd place) (Colombia) Ricardo Mendes Gaschteff (3rd place) (Venezuela) Juan Esteban Triviño (Colombia) Candela Rodríguez Vicente (Spain) Martín Villanueva (Peru) |
| 2025 | (Dominican Republic) Universidad del Caribe (Santo Domingo) | Ana Nari Carrillo (Panama) | Diego Cabrera (Peru) (2nd place) Abril Mariqueo (Mexico) (3rd place) Isabel Soto (Dominican Republic) Luis Felipe Garcia (Spain) Juan Esteban Triviño (Colombia) |
| 2024 | (Colombia) Pontifical Bolivarian University | Manu Zapata Jiménez (Colombia) | Diego Cabrera (Peru) (2nd place) Martín Villanueva Alayo (Peru) (3rd place) Benjamín Vigueras (Mexico) Juan Esteban Triviño (Colombia) Georgina Santos (Ecuador) |
| 2023 | Technological University of Panama | Liliana González (Mexico) | Joceline Paulette Parra (Ecuador) (2nd place) Diego Cabrera (Peru) (3rd place) Luis Felipe García (Spain) Mauricio Jarufe (Peru) Cristhian Mora (Colombia) |
| 2022 | (Spain) King Juan Carlos University | Carlota Monedero (Spain) | Daniel Alejandro Quiroga (Mexico) (2nd place) Daniela Martuccelli (Peru) (3rd place) Mariana Frías Morales (Mexico) Vanessa Hernández Orozco (Colombia) Betzy Denisse Zavaleta (Peru) |
| 2021 | (Ecuador) Escuela Superior Politécnica del Litoral | Leonardo Mauricio Chihuán (Peru) | Alexis Francois Macedo Llaque (Peru) (2nd place) Joceline Paulette Parra (Ecuador) (3rd place) |
| 2020 | (Spain) Complutense University of Madrid | José David Camaño Galván (Mexico) | Benjamín Vigueras Martínez (2nd place) (Mexico) Daniela Martuccelli García and Mauricio Jarufe (Peru) |
| 2019 | (Peru) ESAN University, Lima | Benjamín Vigueras Martínez (Mexico) | Alexis Hernando Cubas (Peru) Jonathan Baltasar Posada (Colombia) |
| 2018 | (Chile) Pontifical Catholic University of Valparaíso | Iván Olmos (Spain) | Juan Carlos Barrera (Colombia) |
| 2017 | (Guatemala) Francisco Marroquín University | Rawill Guzmán (Dominican Republic) | Gonzalo Herreros (Spain) University of Córdoba Iván Olmos (Spain) Escuela de Finanzas |
| 2016 | (Spain) University of Córdoba | Luciano Valenzuela (Chile) | Pepe Herrero Rubí (Spain) University of Granada Jorge Lucena Pérez (Spain) University of Córdoba |
| 2015 | (Colombia) Universidad del Rosario, Bogotá | Diego Javier Carreño (Mexico) | Alberto Escobar (Spain) Jorge Gacitúa (Chile) |
| 2014 | Tec de Monterrey, State of Mexico Campus Atizapán de Zaragoza | Carlos Valverde Álvarez (Spain) | Gonzalo Herreros Moya (Spain) University of Córdoba Jorge Lucena Pérez (Spain) University of Córdoba Patricia Muñoz Carrasco (Spain) Complutense University of Madrid Luciano Valenzuela (Chile) Universidad Santo Tomás |
| 2013 | (Spain) Complutense University of Madrid | Luciano Valenzuela (Chile) | Ricardo Gómez Caro (Chile) Andrés Bello National University |
| 2012 | (Chile) Andrés Bello National University, Santiago | No speeches competition held | |
| 2011 | Central University of Venezuela, Caracas | Nicole Hansen (Chile) | |

=== Best speeches adjudicator ===
| Year | Host | Adjudicator recognised |
|---|---|---|
| 2026 | (Ecuador) Universidad Andina Simón Bolívar (Quito) | (Panama) Ana Nari Carrillo |
| 2025 | (Dominican Republic) Universidad del Caribe (Santo Domingo) | (Mexico) Andrea Marlo |
| 2024 | (Colombia) Pontifical Bolivarian University | (Venezuela) Sofía Molano |
| 2023 | Technological University of Panama | (Venezuela) Valeria Favuzzi |

== Motions ==
=== CMUDE Madrid 2013 ===
Round 1:

This House would punish parents for crimes committed by their (underage) children.

Round 2:

This House would impose the death penalty on government officials who engage in acts of corruption.

Round 3:

This House regrets the social welfare policies promoted by countries caught up in the eurozone crisis.

Round 4:

This House would pay poor people not to have children.

Round 5:

This House would ban financial settlements in lawsuits against pharmaceutical companies.

Round 6:

This House would allow organ donation only to individuals who are themselves donors.

Round 7:

This House would support whistleblowers (Snowden, Darby, Manning).

Round 8:

This House believes that developing countries should nationalise the companies exploiting the country's natural resources.

Round 9:

This House supports media censorship during periods of political crisis.

Quarter-finals:

This House regrets that Brazil is hosting the 2014 Football World Cup.

Semi-finals:

This House would abolish the Catholic Church worldwide.

Final:

This House regrets Spanish colonisation in Latin America.

=== CMUDE Mexico 2014 ===
Round 0:

This House would ban the import of products manufactured using child labour.

Round 1:

This House believes that people have a moral duty to stop shouting slurs such as "puto" or "maricón" at sporting events.

Round 2:

This House believes that public hospitals should be barred from prescribing alternative treatments (for example, homeopathy, acupuncture or Bach flower remedies).

Round 3:

This House regrets the creation of the State of Israel.

Round 4:

This House would ban circuses with animals.

Round 5:

This House would ban the sale of complex financial products.

Round 6:

This House would penalise those who, knowing that they are living with HIV, have sexual relations with others without disclosing it.

Round 7:

This House believes that states should adopt or maintain measures designed to generate nationalist sentiment.

Round 8:

This House believes that smokers should cover the cost of their own medical treatment.

Round 9:

Info slide: "La Bestia" is a freight rail network crossing Mexico from the Guatemalan border to the United States border. Year after year, migrants without legal status (generally from Central and South America) climb onto the roof of the train to cross the country and reach the United States. Deaths on these journeys are common, owing to the danger of the train and the migrants' exposure to crime.

This House believes that the Mexican government (and other governments in comparable situations) should take the measures necessary to prevent people from travelling by means such as "La Bestia".

Octo-finals:

If this House had to choose between holding the FIFA World Cup in Qatar in 2022 or having no World Cup that year, it would choose to have no World Cup.

Quarter-finals:

This House would abolish minimum wages.

Semi-finals:

This House would leave fundamental decisions on the use of each country's natural resources in the hands of citizens, through direct referendums.

Final:

This House justifies citizens forming their own armed groups when the state fails to protect them from organised crime.

Nations Cup, round 1:

Should antiquities and works of art taken over the centuries be returned to their countries of origin?

Nations Cup, round 2:

Is it appropriate to take significant measures against countries that criminalise homosexuality?

Nations Cup, round 3:

Should large amounts of resources continue to be devoted to space research, particularly in times of crisis?

=== CMUDE Bogotá 2015 ===
Round 0:

If it were technologically possible to determine the sexual preferences of unborn children, this House would allow parents to do so.

Round 1:

This House believes that the state has a right to retain the talent it trains.

Round 2:

This House would require national sports teams to be composed in a way that proportionally reflects the sex distribution of their population — for example, when selecting the teams that compete in the FIFA World Cup.

Round 3:

Where a country is facing a humanitarian crisis and the government does not allow foreign aid to enter, this House justifies entry by force.

Round 4:

This House believes that states should not rescue irregular migrants whose lives are put at risk during the migration process.

Round 5:

Info slide: There is a button. If someone presses the button, they receive 10 million dollars to use freely and cause the death of a random person.

This House would press the button.

Round 6:

This House believes that having biological children is immoral.

Round 7:

This House would provide incentives and protection to employees and former employees who report corporate practices with negative social consequences.

Round 8:

This House would conceal scientific evidence that favoured behaviours it wished to discourage.

Round 9:

This House believes that states should actively and competitively produce and distribute pornography that runs counter to the dominant stereotype.

Octo-finals:

This House would ban corporate practices and arrangements that encourage employees to work more than eight hours a day.

Quarter-finals:

Info slide: Suppose you live in a country where abortion is legal, safe and free of charge. You are within the period in which an abortion can be carried out safely. You learn that the child you are expecting would be born with a condition that would cause it great pain and a short life expectancy.

This House believes that you should have an abortion.

Semi-finals:

Info slide: A universal basic income, or citizen's income, is an income paid by the state, as a right of citizenship, to every full member or resident of society, even if they do not wish to work for pay, without regard to whether they are rich or poor — that is, regardless of any other sources of income they may have, and regardless of whom they live with.

This House would implement a universal basic income.

Final:

This House would apply affirmative action in the hiring of public employees in favour of those who have been in prison.

ESL final:

This House would make humanitarian aid conditional on the implementation of population controls in recipient countries.

Nations Cup semi-final:

This House believes that the internet has done more harm than good.

Nations Cup final:

This House would permit research on human beings with their consent, even where the risk of death or extreme suffering was high.

=== CMUDE Córdoba 2016 ===
Round 0:

Info slide: In March of this year, an agreement between the European Union and Turkey was approved. In June, Médecins Sans Frontières released a video in which Joan Tubau, the organisation's general director, announced the decision to renounce public funding from the European Union.

This House believes that Médecins Sans Frontières should not have renounced public funding from the European Union and its member states.

Round 1:

This House believes that, when voting, each citizen should think only of their own interests and not of the common good.

Round 2:

This House believes that the sharing economy (for example, Uber and Airbnb) brings more benefits than harms to people on low incomes.

Round 3:

Info slide: There exists a device — an anti-rape toothed condom — that is inserted into the vagina and traps the penis upon penetration. Attempting to withdraw the penis from the device causes serious injury to the man. Medical assistance is required to remove the device.

This House believes that states should facilitate public access to the anti-rape toothed condom.

Round 4:

This House would advise organisations holding highly minoritarian positions to focus their efforts on defending more widely accepted positions.

Round 5:

This House believes that Hillary will win this general election.

Round 6:

Info slide: You are a man living in Galilee some 2,000 years ago. You are clever, charismatic and able to gather and lead many followers. People believe you are the son of God and that you perform miracles.

This House believes that you should use your influence to spread progressive values on the strength of faith.

Round 7:

This House believes it is legitimate to conduct research on a dead person's body even where this is contrary to the wishes they expressed while alive.

Round 8:

This House believes that the left should regret the Latin American governments of the past 15 years usually identified as left-wing or centre-left.

Round 9:

Info slide: There are two twins who are indistinguishable — absolutely indistinguishable. One of them leads the most brutal terrorist organisation. The other has never been involved. You know nothing bad about him. (He might be a human rights activist, or have a very cute kitten, or — well, who knows.) You have both in custody and both deny being the leader of the terrorist organisation. You cannot confirm which is which.

This House would release them both.

Octo-finals:

This House would ban loans granted to people on low incomes with few requirements and at high interest rates.

Quarter-finals:

This House believes that states should stop classifying people by sex or gender (for example, avoiding segregated toilets or categories on identity documents) and create significant incentives for private actors to do the same.

Semi-finals:

This House would implement educational programmes about the meat industry from early education onwards, on a regular and graphic basis (for example, visits to slaughterhouses or the screening of videos about chicken farms).

Final:

If it were possible, this House would immediately provide internet to all people freely and independently of the wishes of their own governments.

ESL final:

This House believes it is legitimate for states to create or reinforce false historical narratives that promote social cohesion.

Adjudicators' Cup, round 1:

This House believes that states should adopt significant measures so that prostitution is socially perceived as just another job (like being a teacher, a doctor or a carpenter).

Adjudicators' Cup, round 2:

Info slide: At an excavation site, mosquitoes millions of years old were found trapped inside fossilised sap. A group of scientists studied them and found dinosaur blood inside. After studying it, they concluded that it would be feasible to extract damaged dinosaur DNA and, by combining it with frog DNA, create large dinosaurs that could be bred and exhibited to the public in a park to be called Jurassic Park.

This House would build Jurassic Park and open it to the public.

Adjudicators' Cup, semi-final:

This House would prefer to live in a world where personal success and failure were seen as the consequence of chance rather than of personal choices.

Adjudicators' Cup, final:

This House believes that minimum human rights standards must be upheld in prisons even where they cannot be guaranteed outside.

=== CMUDE Guatemala 2017 ===
Round 0: Info slide: In recent years, various Guatemalan social groups have staged numerous demonstrations with a range of social demands. Prominent among them is the repair and maintenance of transport routes.

Motion: This House believes that the state should provide communities with materials so that they can self-manage the maintenance and repair of the access roads to their villages.

Round 1:

This House would seek to dismantle an enclave that is a focal point of lawbreaking, even at the risk of dispersal.

Round 2:

Info slide: A cochlear implant is a surgically implanted electronic device that provides a sense of sound to people with severe hearing impairment. In children, implanting the device at an early age has a high probability of success, but does not guarantee that it will provide the sense of sound.

This House would remove custody from deaf parents who refuse the cochlear implant that could give their deaf children the ability to hear.

Round 3:

Info slide: Akrasia: in the words of Luis Vega Reñón, a case of akrasia is a case of weakness of will or, in a word, of inaction. It occurs when there is something the agent regards as valuable and which they can and should do, but on which they take no action. A case of akrasia is likewise produced by an intentional action that the agent acknowledges runs counter to what they judge to be the best course of action. Akrasia is the gap between what I think and what I do.

This House believes that akrasia is wrong.

Round 4:

This House would have the most important military decisions taken primarily by women.

Round 5:

Info slide: Plain language: a form of communication designed to ensure that the recipient of the message understands it quickly, easily and as completely as possible. Plain language strives to be simple to understand and to use. Example: "Meaningful learning environments are a sine qua non for facilitating and improving the teaching-learning process" versus "For children to learn well, they need good schools."

This House believes that all state documents produced (for example, laws, court rulings, benefit schemes) should be written in plain language.

Round 6:

Info slide: "Coyote" is a term for people who are paid to smuggle irregular migrants across the border. "NGO Virtuous Coyotes": 1. We don't charge you; 2. We will not let you be harmed; 3. We believe you are a good human being; 4. If we are caught, we have lawyers.

This House supports the Virtuous Coyotes.

Round 7:

Info slide: [Leaflet] Stop complaining about your country, just do your part properly, because you are your country and everything starts at home. Individualisation of blame: the process by which emphasis is placed on the capacity of each citizen, individually, to bring about change.

This House believes that the individualisation of blame prevents change.

Round 8:

Info slide: Remittances are transfers of money sent from the immigration-receiving country to the migrant's country of origin. In studying remittances, we consider the perspective of both the country of origin and the receiving country.

This House rejects remittances.

Round 9:

This House believes that the LGBTI+ community should include the P for paedophilia as part of its movement.

Octo-finals:

This House believes that the state should provide strong economic incentives to members of ethnic minorities with their own culture to enter the formal education system on an exclusive basis.

Quarter-finals:

This House believes that all hiring should be carried out through a third party in order to ensure that applicants' personal information is not taken into account (for example, photograph, gender, age, university, etc.).

Semi-finals:

Info slide: The Mara Salvatrucha and Barrio 18 are extremely violent criminal organisations. They operate in Zone 18 and similar areas of Guatemala City. They are estimated to have 9,000 members, who join from the age of six as a result of a context of lack of opportunity and of access to education, health and housing, compounded by other causes such as family breakdown, domestic violence, sexual abuse, alcohol and drugs.

This House believes that the Guatemalan state should, by all available means, take into its custody, supervise and educate in residential centres all children (non-gang members) over the age of five in Zone 18 and similar areas of Guatemala City.

Final:

Info slide: Donald Trump and Nicolás Maduro have been poisoned; unless they are given an antidote they will die. You have only one antidote. You must save one and only one.

This House would save Nicolás Maduro.

ESL final:

This House would not sign a peace agreement that had not been approved by the victims of the conflict.

Adjudicators' Cup, round 1:

This House believes that cybersex is not infidelity.

Adjudicators' Cup, round 2:

Info slide: You are at the peak of your life; everything is going well for you. But one day, you kill someone.

This House believes that you should dismember that person and conceal the killing.

Adjudicators' Cup, round 3:

This House, as a fifteen-year-old girl, would celebrate her birthday.

Adjudicators' Cup, final:

This House believes that if God exists, he would be proud of us.

=== CMUDE Valparaíso 2018 ===
Round 0:

This House regrets the glorification of drug traffickers such as Pablo Escobar.

Round 1:

This House believes that countries should grant indigenous communities a monopoly over the production and marketing of the cultural symbols they created.

Round 2:

Info slide: The "right to try" is a United States law giving people with life-threatening illnesses the right to access experimental treatments, understood as those not yet approved by the competent authority.

This House supports the right to try.

Round 3:

This House believes that states should impose a selective tax on art forms with a sexist past — for example, tango, flamenco and reggaeton.

Round 4:

Assuming it has to choose, this House, as the United States, would accept Latin American refugees exclusively and in their entirety.

Round 5:

Info slide: A tangible guarantee is one in which public assets (buildings, land, natural resource exploitation rights, etc.) are used as collateral to be seized in the event of definitive non-payment (default).

This House believes that, in order to access financial bailouts, states should provide tangible guarantees.

Round 6:

This House would adjust the assessment criteria applied to students according to their socio-economic background.

Round 7:

Info slide: Afterlife A = After a life well lived, the ethereal soul separates from the physical body and joins an eternal, serene community of souls and God (with no physical body). Afterlife B = After a life well lived, the ethereal soul separates from the physical body, enters another physical body and lives a new life carrying over the rewards of the previous one. Nobody knows which afterlife exists.

This House prefers Afterlife A to Afterlife B.

Round 8:

Assuming a state has to promote a model of affective-sexual relationships, this House would prefer a society in which monogamy predominates over polygamy.

Round 9:

This House would grant the residents of a neighbourhood the right to vet and approve people wishing to move into it.

Partial double-octo-finals:

Info slide: Greenland belongs to the Kingdom of Denmark but has been self-governing since 2008, so it has the power to declare independence or join another country by popular vote. Greenland is home to the largest unexploited reserves of rare earths on the planet (the world's scarcest minerals and chemical elements), used to produce countless technologies from mobile phones to wind turbines.

This House would place Greenland's rare earth reserves in an international trust.

Octo-finals:

This House, as the government of a democratic country, would impose punitive measures on those who spread fake news during election periods.

Quarter-finals:

This House would modify criminal sentences by popular petition.

Semi-finals:

Info slide: Assuming that humanity colonises Mars and that an equitable international forum for discussion is created with the backing of those who make it up (countries, companies, autonomous capital, individuals).

This House would prefer to allocate it to the existing states on Earth in proportion to their population rather than establishing a single Martian state.

Final:

Info slide: #MeToo is a movement that began virally as a social media hashtag to report cases of sexual abuse suffered by women that are difficult or impossible to prove in court. Truth and reconciliation commissions are official state bodies that produce public reports (known as memoirs) compiling testimony given by people about crimes they have suffered, covered up, witnessed or committed.

This House would create truth and reconciliation commissions for #MeToo, in which men who have been accused could acknowledge their guilt without anonymity in exchange for immunity.

ESL final:

This House supports the occupation of educational institutions as a method of political protest.

=== CMUDE Lima 2019 ===
Round 0:

Info slide: ASEAN is an intergovernmental organisation of Southeast Asian states made up of Malaysia, Indonesia, Brunei, Vietnam, Cambodia, Laos, Myanmar, Singapore, Thailand and the Philippines.

This House, as ASEAN, would establish free movement of workers among its member countries.

Round 1:

This House believes that indigenous communities should sabotage infrastructure projects on their territory that harm their communities (for example, road blockades, destruction of infrastructure, etc.).

Round 2:

Info slide: "Embedded journalists" are those who, in highly violent areas, constantly accompany military troops in order to cover an armed conflict, joining them in their operations, including combat, and living alongside them for several days or weeks.

This House would ban embedding in journalism.

Round 3:

This House regrets the strong personalisation of social and political movements (Le Pen in France, Justin Trudeau in Canada, Emma Watson in "HeForShe" or Greta Thunberg with the youth climate movement).

Round 4:

Info slide: An ethnic rotation model is one in which, once the head of state (president or prime minister) belongs to one ethnic group, no person from that same group may again hold the office until a person from each of the main ethnic groups has held it. Thus, if there are four ethnic groups, the following four terms would see four presidents from the four ethnicities.

In countries with a history of ethnic conflict, discrimination and/or tension (for example, Nigeria, India, Myanmar, Iraq), this House would introduce ethnic rotation models.

Round 5:

Info slide: Some examples of "potentially harmful religious beliefs" include, but are not limited to: (1) the belief that a product or act can cure diseases such as cancer; (2) the belief that certain medical treatments are sinful, such as blood transfusions or organ transplants; (3) the belief that it is necessary to isolate oneself from contemporary society in closed communities (such as the Amish or the Neocatechumenal Way).

This House would hold religious institutions legally liable for the harm suffered by their followers as a result of their "potentially harmful religious beliefs".

Round 6:

Info slide: Quantitative easing, also known as large-scale asset purchases, is a monetary policy used when inflation is very low or negative and there is a demand crisis. Under quantitative easing, a central bank buys predetermined quantities of government bonds or other financial assets, both public and from private companies, in order to inject liquidity directly into the economy.

In contexts of economic recession, with low or negative inflation and a demand crisis, this House believes it is better for central banks to inject liquidity directly to ordinary citizens rather than pursuing quantitative easing policies.

Round 7:

This House prefers a world where everyone has average abilities and characteristics (average intelligence, average looks…) to one in which disparity exists.

Round 8:

This House believes that states should create public pharmaceutical companies.

Round 9:

This House believes that left-wing parties should focus their electoral platforms primarily on economic and class-based measures rather than on those centred on social identities (for example, tax cuts for lower-income groups rather than greater emancipation of women or LGBT visibility).

Octo-finals:

This House regrets the narrative that work is the best way to empower vulnerable groups (for example, people living in poverty, ex-convicts, people with addictions, etc.).

Quarter-finals:

Info slide: There are a number of refugee camps around the world that have existed for decades and house large populations. Examples include Dadaab in Kenya (211,000 inhabitants since 1991), Jabalia in Gaza (110,000 inhabitants since 1948) and Katumba in Tanzania (76,000 inhabitants since 1972).

This House believes that the UN General Assembly should recognise as independent states those refugee camps whose existence extends beyond 25 years.

Semi-finals:

Info slide: Collectivism is the principle of prioritising the group over each of the individuals who make it up.

This House prefers a society that emphasises collectivism over individualism.

Final:

Info slide: According to figures from the Peruvian Truth and Reconciliation Commission, the internal conflict with the Shining Path in the 1980s caused approximately 70,000 deaths, of which around 54% were caused by the terrorist organisation and 34% by the armed forces. For the purposes of this debate, a new study exists that irrefutably demonstrates that the figures were manipulated and that most of the victims were caused by the state, with the Shining Path responsible for 30% of the deaths rather than 54%. The author has died, so the study could not be repeated, and you hold the only existing copy.

This House would destroy the study.

ESL final:

This House prefers a world in which all work could be done effectively and at an affordable cost by robots.

Provisional ESL final (ultimately not used):

Info slide: Harvey Milk High School is a New York school that seeks to be a safe space for LGBTQ+ children and those questioning their sexuality.

This House would create schools exclusively for LGBTQ+ children.

=== CMUDE Madrid Online 2020 ===
Round 1:

This House prefers a world in which all friendships and romantic relationships are expected to be temporary.

Round 2:

This House would manage natural resources jointly through the United Nations rather than having each country manage its own autonomously. (Examples: the UN managing the Amazon, Lake Victoria, the Himalayan glaciers, cross-border oil fields, etc.)

Round 3:

This House regrets that private companies fund public higher education institutions.

Round 4:

Info slide: African American Vernacular English (AAVE) is a group of dialects that developed among African American communities in the U.S. and is predominantly spoken by the African American community today. AAVE is often wrongly called "broken standard English", although it is a separate dialect with its own sounds, grammar and vocabulary. "Code-switching" refers to alternating between one language/dialect and another depending on the situation and the people around you.

This House believes that parents should discourage their children from practising code-switching.

Round 5:

Info slide: When a company wants to sell its products on Amazon, it must sign a distribution contract. The general terms of the contract include: Amazon gives you: a. advertising and a presence for your product on its platform and catalogue; b. distribution at the most competitive price on the market in the chosen geographical area. In exchange you give them: a. information about the product's details (how this product differs from others, information about the production chain, etc.); b. information about demand for the product.

This House believes that small and medium-sized enterprises should use Amazon to distribute their products.

Round 6:

This House believes that environmental justice should become a central objective of the feminist movement (for example, by supporting ecofeminism, spreading the narrative that women are part of nature as a whole, campaigning against water pollution and air pollution, etc.).

Round 7:

This House would encourage the media (series, films, advertising) to portray stereotypically happy people as introverted, reserved and solitary.

Round 8:

This House, as an artist, would prefer to depict the world as it would like it to be rather than as it sees it.

Round 9:

This House believes that the WTO should allow developing countries to protect certain industries and exclude them from free trade.

Octo-finals:

Assuming it were feasible, this House would prefer a coalition built around democratic values that disregarded ideological divisions (for example, a coalition of left and right) in order to oppose the Bolsonaro government.

Quarter-finals:

This House regrets the prevailing narrative in monotheistic religions that if you repent of your deeds on your deathbed you will receive forgiveness and salvation.

Semi-finals:

This House believes that in countries with endemic corruption problems, law-abiding prosecutors should use illegal tactics to secure a conviction (for example, falsifying evidence, obtaining evidence unlawfully, bribing judges, etc.).

Final:

Info slide: In recent years, many people with high purchasing power, such as Jeff Bezos and Peter Thiel, have invested significantly in strategies to substantially prolong their lives and even secure their immortality. Among many others, these include: 1) the creation of foundations, research centres and clinics focused on halting ageing and prolonging life, such as Calico, BioAge, The Longevity Fund and AgeX; 2) the search for ways to transfer human consciousness to robots or artificial intelligence; 3) processes for freezing and preserving the bodies or brains of people deemed important, with a view to their future cloning.

This House regrets efforts to find immortality.

=== CMUDE Ecuador Online 2021 ===
Round 1: Info slide: The heroic version of medicine is one in which healthcare professionals have been culturally regarded as heroic figures whose mission is to save our lives. The human version of medicine is one that acknowledges the limitations of healthcare professionals, and whose motto is "cure when possible, relieve sometimes, accompany always".

This House believes that healthcare professionals should fight against the hegemonic vision of heroic medicine in order to replace it with human medicine.

Round 2: Given the educational crisis caused by the COVID-19 pandemic in developing countries, this House believes that public universities should admit all students who sat the entrance examination, regardless of whether they passed it.

Round 3: Info slide: "Civilisation or barbarism" is a trope found in numerous Latin American novels of the 19th and 20th centuries. They present a sharp contrast between barbarism (wild nature, rural people, instinct) and civilisation (the city, educated people, the mastery of impulses). Clearly good or evil characters are used to argue that each side represents backwardness or progress. Examples of these novels, highly significant for the national culture of their countries and for the canon of Spanish American literature, include Facundo, Doña Bárbara and One Hundred Years of Solitude.

Canon: a catalogue of authors or works of a literary or intellectual genre regarded as exemplary.

This House believes that works presenting a "civilisation"/"barbarism" dichotomy should not form part of the literary canon.

Round 4:

For the practical purposes of this debate, the status of "apolitical" implies that a group exists entirely in parallel to the ordinary operation of the state and its institutions, while its activities also take place outside the political and public sphere.

This House regrets the narrative that perceives criminal groups as apolitical actors.

Round 5: Stagflation is a situation in which considerable sustained growth in inflation and stagnation of supply occur simultaneously. A restrictive or contractionary monetary policy is implemented by central banks by raising interest rates, with the aim of reducing inflation, but with the risk of generating unemployment and slowing economic growth.

In situations where stagflation coexists with a strong fiscal stimulus policy for consumption, this House believes that central banks should launch a restrictive monetary policy with the aim of reducing inflation, even if doing so aggravates the stagnation of economic activity.

Round 6: Techno-optimism holds, above all, that in the future technology will be able to remedy the major problems afflicting the world (climate change, unemployment, education, among others).

This House prefers a world in which efforts against climate change are techno-optimist in character.

Round 7: There are several worldviews of indigenous justice in Ecuador. Under the constitution, these are generally based on the ancestral customs and practices of the community. They are conciliatory and corrective in nature (corporal penalties intended to purge the soul of evil) in response to offences. Penalties are decided through community councils or by the community's leader. For indigenous justice to be applicable, four requirements must be met: 1) that the matters relate to the community's internal affairs; 2) that all parties involved are indigenous; 3) that it takes place within the community's territory; 4) that the penalties are confined to the Western conception of human rights. Ordinary justice in Ecuador is based on courts and tribunals, in a manner very similar to that of other Latin American countries.

This House believes that Ecuador should incorporate both forms of justice indiscriminately within the national framework (e.g. allowing the application of corrective penalties consistent with human rights and of conciliation in ordinary justice cases, giving courts the option of following either system in any case, integrating community councils as a mechanism for adjudicating cases, among others), rather than keeping them separate within their respective jurisdictions.

Round 8: Until 1950, when it was forcibly annexed by China, Tibet was a theocracy led by the Dalai Lama. After the failed 1959 uprising, the Dalai Lama went into exile in India — a country that has always supported him — and over time became a charismatic world leader. China has sought to exert cultural influence over the region, including through repression. The current Dalai Lama is 86 and said in 2020 that he did not support an independent Tibet, but rather an autonomous republic within China in which all of the Asian giant's ethnic groups live in harmony. When the Dalai Lama dies, the leadership of Tibetan Buddhism must seek out his reincarnation. It will be found in a child whose date of birth is close to the date of the Dalai Lama's death, after the child passes a series of tests. China, however, wishes to disregard this religious tradition and have the Communist Party choose the next leader of Tibet's Buddhists, so as to secure a sympathetic leadership that will help it put an end to independence aspirations in the region of Kashmir. The dispute also involves India, which, besides having interests in the succession, has the security of its northern border at stake.

This House believes that the leadership of Tibetan Buddhism should prioritise the search for the next Dalai Lama in China rather than in India.

Round 9: One of the main mechanisms used by social programmes and public policies is conditional transfers. Most of these use an intermediary in order to address the problems the programme seeks to solve. For example: a policy whose purpose is to improve the natural environment provides a cash transfer to indigenous communities on condition that they protect the environment and commit to carrying out community works for its preservation and restoration.

This House opposes the implementation of public policies and programmes that place women as intermediaries in the resolution of social problems (e.g. poverty, education, nutrition, among others).

Octo-finals: This House believes that states of the Global North should cease sending foreign development aid to countries of the Global South and instead engage actively with those countries through trade treaties and agreements.

Quarter-finals: The Islamist party United Arab List has just become the first Palestinian political formation to enter an Israeli government. The new prime minister is Naftali Bennett, an ultranationalist elected by a margin of one vote, giving rise to a historically fragmented coalition (three far-right parties, two centre, two left and the United List) that came together to end Benjamin Netanyahu's 12-year tenure.

This House regrets the United Arab List's decision to join the coalition.

Semi-finals: This House would have preferred a world in which the principal source of truth had been religion rather than science.

Final: In settings where crimes against humanity have taken place (genocides, wars, abuse of state power, etc.), this House believes that post mortem trials should be held for perpetrators never tried during their lifetimes.
