= Verduga =

Verduga is a surname. Notable people with the surname include:

- Cecilia Paredes Verduga (born 1971), Ecuadorian engineer
- Enrique Verduga (born 1964), Ecuadorian footballer
- Lincoln Verduga Loor (1917–2009), Ecuadorian journalist
