= El Hacedor =

El Hacedor may refer to:

- Fundación El Hacedor, non-profit organization
- Dreamtigers, or El Hacedor, book by the Argentine author Jorge Luis Borges
