= Annabel Miguelena =

Panamanian writer, actress and lawyer (born 1984)

- Born: 6 October 1984 (age 41); Chitré, Panama
- Occupations: Writer, lawyer, actress
- Writing career
- Genres: Fiction, short stories, theatre

Annabel Miguelena is a Panamanian writer, actress and lawyer.

== Biography ==
She was born in Chitré in 1984.

She published Amo tus pies mugrientos (El Hacedor, 2011), Punto final (UTP, 2005) and Pedacito de luna (Fundacion Buenos Vecinos, 2009). She was winner of the 2010 minicuento contest organized by the Spanish Revista Minatura and the First Mention of Premio Nacional de Cuento "José María Sánchez" 2004 organized by the Universidad Tecnológica de Panamá.

In 2010, she wrote, produced, composed the music and acted in the play Ana Mía, which was nominated for three Premios Escena in Panama. It won Best Original Play and Best Original Song.
