= Fundación El Hacedor =

- Founded: 2007
- Founder: José Luis Rodríguez Pittí
- Type: Foundation (non-profit)
- Location(s): Panamá, Rep. of Panamá and Toronto, Canada
- Method: Cultural projects
- Website: EL HACEDOR

Fundación El Hacedor is a non-profit organization founded in August 2007 by the writer José Luis Rodríguez Pittí to "advance cultural, social, and educational projects, by using literature, music, and art as a vehicle to achieve personal and community development"

The Foundation has been involved in cultural recovery projects to highlight Panamanian identity, education and training programs, programs with risk groups (prisons, schools in red zones), forums, conferences, recitals, environmental projects, artistic events, and concerts.

Some of those activities are Convergence Point (with La Novena), Art from the Earth (with UNEP, United Nations, and Sembrarte), Literatour: Culture in the Provinces, Leer es una Fiesta (with French Embassy in Panamá and the Alliance Francaise), the Congreso Internacional de Literatura Centroamericana (with the Universidad Tecnológica de Panamá and Purdue University), the Forum for Culture and Development (with Enredarte, Fundación Danilo Pérez, the Panamanian Government, and other cultural organizations), the Festival of Arts and Literature (with more than twenty public and private organizations) in San Francisco de la Montaña in the Province of Veraguas, Panama, and El Sueño Loco de San Salvi in Firenze, Italy.

Fundación El Hacedor has an imprint, "El Hacedor", under which it has published works by several authors, among others: Annabel Miguelena, Lilian Guevara, and Aura Sibila Benjamín. "El Hacedor" has participated in the Feria del Libro de Guatemala in 2008, the NY Book Expo in 2009, the Feria del Libro de Buenos Aires in 2010, the Feria Internacional del Libro de Santo Domingo in 2011, the Feria Internacional del Libro de Cuba 2012, and the Feria Iberoamericana del Libro in Ottawa, Canada in 2022.
