= Centro de Tecnologías de Información =

ESPOL investigation center

The Centro de Tecnologías de Información (CTI), or Information Technology Center in English, is a research center at the Escuela Superior Politecnica del Litoral (ESPOL) in Guayaquil, Ecuador. CTI's main research area is information and communications technologies in education.

CTI is located in the "Gustavo Galindo" campus of ESPOL and is one of the research centers associated with the Parque del Conocimiento (PARCON) project of ESPOL.
