= Pforzheim University of Applied Sciences =

University in Baden-Württemberg, Germany

Coordinates: 48.8785°N 8.7172°E

Pforzheim University
- Hochschule Pforzheim
- Type: Public
- Established: 1877; 149 years ago
- Affiliations: AACSB (accredited)
- Principal: Prof. Dr. Ulrich Jautz
- Academic staff: 800
- Students: 6,200
- Location: Pforzheim, Baden-Württemberg, Germany
- Campus: urban
- Website: www.hs-pforzheim.de

Pforzheim University is a public university of applied science in Germany. Located in Pforzheim, it was created to meet the demand for specialists in the jewelry industry and science, before it grew to become one of the most important and research-oriented universities of applied sciences in Germany. The main buildings of the campus are located in the southern part of the city (Tiefenbronner Straße), with affiliated institutes scattered around the city Pforzheim. The Pforzheim University Business School is one of only eleven institutions in Germany to have received the AACSB accreditation.

== History ==
The university was founded in 1877 with its origins in the Ducal Academy of Arts and Crafts and Technical School for the Metal Processing Industry. The other faculty—the Pforzheim Business School came of the national business college that established in 1963. In the year 1992, a new faculty was established and named as The Faculty of Engineering and the other two faculties were also amalgamated together and since then it became the Hochschule Pforzheim University of Applied Science which enrolls more than 6,000 students nowadays. Since 1992, the university has regularly hosted international design workshops attracting students from across Europe."Design Workshops at Pforzheim University".

== Schools ==
- DESIGN PF (Dean Prof. Johann Stockhammer)
- ENGINEERING PF (Dean Prof. Dr.-Ing. Matthias Weyer)
- BUSINESS PF (Dean Prof. Dr. Thomas Cleff)

The numbers of students in each faculty are:

- 56% School of Business
- 33% School of Engineering
- 11% School Design

The university offers a wide range of courses regarding to jewelry, accessory design, visual communication, industrial design, transportation design etc. at DESIGN PF.

Among others ENGINEERING PF offers electrical engineering, information technology, business and engineering, mechatronics, medical engineering, mechanical engineering, technical information technology, etc.

BUSINESS PF offers Purchasing and Logistics, Marketing, Market and Communication Research, Finance and Accounting, Business Information Systems, Management, Human Resources Management, etc.

In addition to these bachelors programs, the university also has master degrees programs including Master of Business Administration (MBA) which has a very high ranking among German universities.

== MBA Program ==
The Master Programme MBA in International Management (full-time) is the first state-accredited MBA program which combines general management education, marketing and managerial skills to face global challenges. The language of the instruction is in English and it has four semesters for the students without a business background and the business graduates can join the program at the 2nd semester.

Application deadline	Start date	Credits	Duration
June 15 for W/S, December 15 for S/S	October/ March	120 ECTS	2 years, full-time

=== Main Disciplines ===
- Corporate Finance
- B2B-Marketing
- Brand Management
- International Finance Reporting Standards
- European Financial Markets
- Supply Chain management

etc.

=== Accreditation ===
- AACSB: As ninth in Germany, the Pforzheim Business School has been accredited by AACSB International in 2011.
- AQAS: The MBA program was accredited by AQAS, Bonn ("Agentur für Qualitätssicherung durch Akkreditierung von Studiengängen"), an agency dedicated for the accreditation of higher education institutions in Germany.

=== Partner Universities ===
For more than 40 years Pforzheim University has been supporting exchange programs with international partner universities. Pforzheim University supports for the exchange of students about 100 multilateral arrangements with international partner universities in about 50 countries. The schools are also members of international networks like CUMULUS (International Association of Universities and Colleges of Art, Design and Media), GE4 (Global Education: Exchange for Engineers and Entrepreneurs), or Nibes (Network of International Business and Economic Schools).

The MBA students are able to have the opportunities to study in their 3rd. semester at one of the partner universities.

==== Selection of Partner Universities in Europe ====
- École supérieure de commerce et management
- Grande Ecole de Commerce et de Management, ESC Clermont, France
- ISCTE – Lisbon University Institute
- University of Ljubljana

==== Selection of Partner Universities in Americas ====
- ESAN University, Peru
- Insper Instituto de Ensino e Pesquisa, Brasil
- University of South Carolina, USA
- University of Wyoming. USA
- Pennsylvania State University, USA
- Lehigh University, USA
- UMASS Lowell, USA
- Monterrey Institute of Technology and Higher Education, Mexico

==== Selection of Partner Universities in Asia-Pacific ====
- Indian Institute of Foreign Trade
- Indian Institutes of Management
- Indian Institute of Science
- Gadjah Mada University
- National Institute of Design
- Bandung Institute of Technology
- Hanyang University
