= ESAN University =

Private university in Peur

- Type: Private university
- Established: July 25, 1963 (62 years ago) as ESAN - Escuela de Administración de Negocios para Graduados
- President: Jorge Talavera Traverso, PhD
- Vice-president: Academic: Jaime Serida Nishimura, PhD of Investigation: Martin Santana Ormeño, PhD
- Dean: Graduate School of Business: Peter Yamakawa Tsuja, PhD; School of Economics and Management: Jorge Cortez Cumpa, MA; Engineering School: Javier del Carpio Gallegos, PhD
- Faculty: 198
- Students: 5727
- Undergraduates: 4228
- Postgraduates: 1499
- Location: Alonso de Molina 1652, Monterrico, Santiago de Surco, Lima, Peru; 12.105°S 76.961°W
- Colors: Granate
- Website: www.esan.edu.pe = www.ue.edu.pe

ESAN University or Universidad ESAN in Spanish (acronym: ESAN) is a non-profit private university, located in Lima, Peru.

ESAN University is a leading academic institution in business education, that was founded in 1963 as ESAN - Escuela de Administración de Negocios para Graduados, the first graduate business school in the Spanish speaking world and in Peru. Throughout these years ESAN has achieved a relevant role in Peru and Latin America, based on the quality of its MBA program, specialized masters, advanced management and executive education programs among others.

From the years 2003 to 2007, ESAN established ESAN University and launched its first undergraduate programs in business, economics and engineering. Currently, in addition to its master's and executive education programs, it offers the Doctoral Program in Management, as well as nine programs at the undergraduate level and two professionalization programs for adults.

== History ==
In 1962, the USAID - U.S. Agency for International Development, established by the US president John F. Kennedy, summons the main business schools to study the possibility of developing management and businesses programs in Latin America. This project was trusted to Stanford Graduate School of Business. Its Dean, Ernest Arbuckle, assumed the challenge and grouped up a team of professors led by Gail M. Oxley and Alan B. Coleman to evaluate in-site the feasibility of undertaking this ambitious project in Peru.

This is how on July 25, 1963, the Peruvian and American governments founded the “Escuela de Administración de Negocios para Graduados, ESAN” or “ESAN, Graduate School of Business” as known in English. Its organization was trusted to the Stanford Graduate School of Business and professor Alan B. Coleman. Shortly after, a seminar on international high management was taught. A few months later, ESAN opened its doors and professionals from all Latin America applied for studying in the first full-time MBA program in the Spanish-speaking world.

The following year, on April 1, 1964, the 1st promotion of the MBA program or Programa Magister started classes. More than 55 years have gone by since then, but the tone, style and spirit of the American teachers who forged ESAN remain valid even these days in ESAN University and ESAN Graduate School of Business.

== Organization ==
ESAN University, being a private non-profit institution, has academic, economic, regulatory and government autonomy. It is governed by its Statute, its internal regulations and other State regulations that are applicable to it within its own autonomy. The government of the ESAN University corresponds to its organs and authorities, which are: the General Assembly, the University Council, the President, the Academic vice-president and the Research vice-president and the deans of the Graduate School and of the Faculties.

=== Undergraduate programs ===
Currently ESAN University offers undergraduate programs divided in three schools:

School of Economics and Management:

- Administration and Marketing,
- Administration and Finance,
- Economy and International Business,

School of Engineering:

- Information Technology and Systems Engineering,
- Industrial Engineering,
- Environmental Management and Engineering,

School of Law and Social Sciences:

- Organizational Psychology
- Consumer Psychology
- Corporate Law

==== International double degree titles ====
ESAN University has been a pioneer in offering the double degree program, where under the double degree program, ESAN University students can study one or two years abroad and obtain a university degree from the following allied universities or business schools that are part of the ESAN network with:

- France: Montpellier Business School, YSchools (Groupe ESC Troyes), EM Strasbourg Business School, ESC Clermont Business School, IESEG School of Business.
- Germany: Hochschule Pforzheim - Pforzheim University of Applied Sciences, Fachhochschule Dortmund - Dortmund University of Applied Sciences and Arts
- Colombia: Pontificia Universidad Javeriana, Universidad del Rosario.

=== Graduate programs: ESAN Graduate School of Business ===
ESAN Graduate School of Business is considered the business school with the highest prestige in Peru and one of the top in Latin America.

==== MBA with international dual masters degrees ====
ESAN's International MBA program offers double master degree with the following partners universities:

- ICHEC Brussels Management School, Brussels, Belgium
- Schulich School of Business, York University, Toronto, Canada
- HEC Montréal, Université de Montréal, Canada
- EDHEC Business School, Lille, France
- ESC Clermont Business School, Clermont-Ferrand, France
- IÉSEG School of Management, Lille, France
- Montpellier Business School, Montpellier, France
- HHL Leipzig Graduate School of Management, Leipzig, Germany
- NUCB, Nagoya University of Commerce and Business, Nagoya, Japan
- The University of Texas at Austin, Austin, Texas, USA
- University of Dallas, Dallas, Texas, United States
- Florida International University, Florida, USA

== International accreditations ==
ESAN received AMBA (Association of MBAs) accreditation in 2002, being the first Peruvian MBA program and institution of higher education to be internationally accredited by this association.

In 2013 ESAN University received international accreditation from AACSB (Association to Advance Collegiate Schools of Business) for ten of their programs:

Seven master's degrees programs:

- Master in Business Administration - MBA
- Master in Finance
- Master in Marketing
- Master in Human Resources Management & Organization
- Master in Information Technology
- Master in Supply Chain Management

Three bachelor's degrees programs:

- Administration & Marketing
- Administration & Finance
- Economy & International Business.

In 2017, ICACIT - Instituto de Calidad y Acreditación de Programas de Computación, Ingeniería y Tecnología, member of Washington Accord, recognized by SINEACE - Sistema Nacional de Evaluación, Acreditación y Certificación de la Calidad Educativa of Peru, awarded the accreditation for two of ESAN's Engineering programs, using ABET Criteria for Accrediting Technology Engineering Programs:

- Industrial de Commercial Engineering
- Information Technology and System Engineering

In 2020, CONAED - Consejo para la Acreditación en la Enseñanza en Derecho, a Mexican organization that recognizes and supports academic excellence in higher education, recognized by SINEACE - Sistema Nacional de Evaluación, Acreditación y Certificación de la Calidad Educativa of Peru, awarded the accreditation of ESAN's program in:

- Corporate Law

== Technological infrastructure: ESAN Data and FabLab ESAN ==
ESAN University has a campus located in the Santiago de Surco district in Lima, with 89,000 square meters.

The university has an information center specialized in economics and business (ESAN Cendoc), in charge of the general coordination of the CLADEA Information Center Directors Association, a network made up of more than 130 university libraries in Latin America and the Caribbean. ESAN Cendoc has more than 60,000 book titles, 15,000 digitized titles in Spanish and English, 15,000 titles of magazines or printed or digital periodicals, as well as databases of various business disciplines.

Founded in 1981, as its information technology center, ESAN Data, and inaugurated by the ex-president of Peru Arch. Fernando Belaunde Terry, it is in charge of creating technological services and tools for the service of education and the business sector. In 1991, ESAN Data is a pioneer of the internet in Peru, installing the first internet connection point of Peru in its university campus in Monterrico.

Since 2013, ESAN has created the digital manufacturing laboratory, Fab lab ESAN, which is part of the global innovation network FAB LAB Network of the Massachusetts Institute of Technology. This laboratory allows students and teachers of various careers to make 3D prints using machines, equipment and printers. FabLab ESAN is the only recognized Center for Scientific Research, Technological Development and Innovation (R + D + i) by the National Council of Science, Technology and Technological Innovation -CONCYTEC, as well as the only Peruvian partner laboratory of the Master in Design for Distributed Innovation of the Fab City Global Initiative. Additionally, it is the first digital Fab Lab of a private university in Peru to be a node for the Fab Academy Diploma.

== International memberships ==
ESAN is a founding member of Consejo Latinoamericano de Escuelas de Administración y Dirección de Empresas (CLADEA), as well as of the Business Association of Latin American Studies (BALAS). It is also accredited member of the Association of MBAs (AMBA) and of the Association to Advance Collegiate Schools of Business (AACSB). It is also, the member in Peru of PIM - Partnership in International Management. Additionally, of the European Foundation for Management Development (EFMD), of the Network of International Business Schools - nibs, of NIBES - Network of International Business and Economics Schools, of the Global Partners in Education (GPE) and also of the European Doctoral programs Association in Management & Business Administration (EDAMBA). Thanks to these international recognitions and partnerships, ESAN University offers its students more than 130 international exchange agreements at renowned universities on 4 continents.

== Academic contributions ==
ESAN University is the owner of the ranked The Journal of Economics, Finance and Administrative Science (JEFAS) that publishes high-quality peer-reviewed research on economics, finance and administration. Published in partnership with Emerald Publishing since 2017. Previously, JEFAS was published with Elsevier since 2012. From 1992 to 2009, it was published under the name of Cuadernos de Difusión.

== Rankings ==
According to América Economía Magazine, ESAN's MBA Program is ranked No. 1 in Peru and remains the Top 5 of the best Masters in Business Administration in Latin America since 2019.

QS Global MBA Ranking: Latin America ranked ESAN's MBA program in the Top 3 of the best in Latin America in 2020

According to the Annual Survey of Executives of the Lima Chamber of Commerce, ESAN remains No. 1 as the most preferred graduate school in Peru for several consecutive years.
