= Cecilia Paredes Verduga =

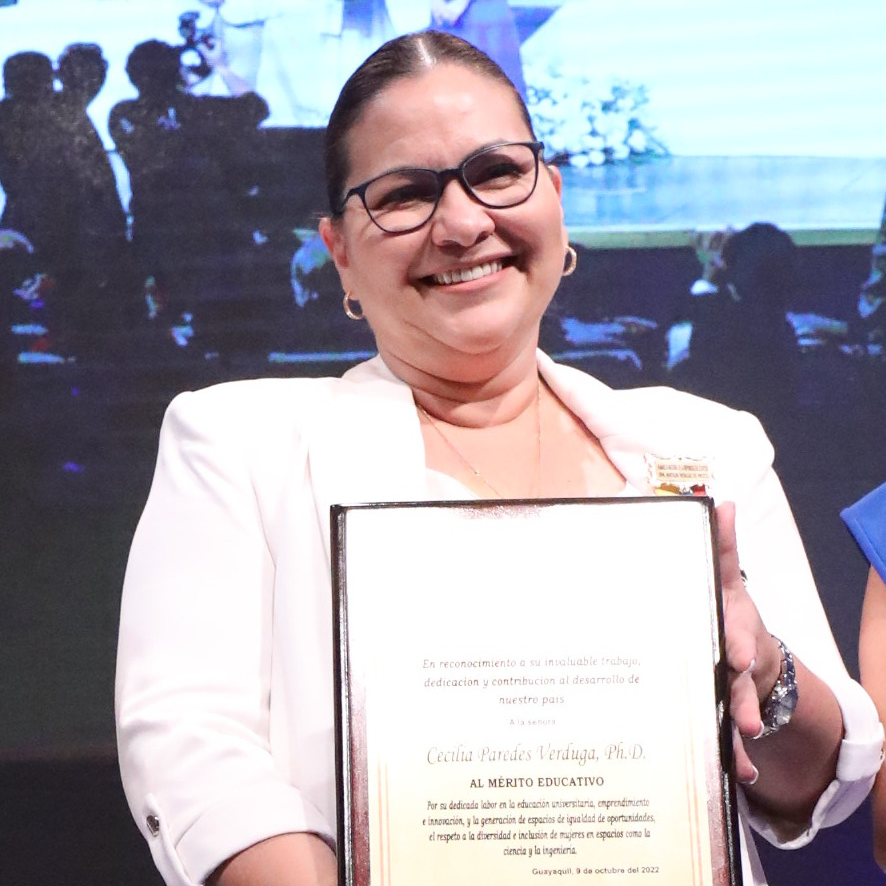
- in 2022
- Born: October 27, 1971 (age 54); Guayaquil
- Education: ESPOL Polytechnic University and Rutgers University
- Occupation: Rector
- Known for: Rector of ESPOL Polytechnic University

Cecilia Paredes Verduga (born October 27, 1971) is an Ecuadorian engineer and university professor. She is the rector of ESPOL Polytechnic University which is in the city of Guayaquil.

== Life ==
Verduga was born in 1971 in the city of Guayaquil and her father was an ESPOL graduate engineer. She took her first degree at ESPOL in Mechanical Engineering before going to New Jersey to study at Rutgers University. At Rutgers she took a masters and doctorate in materials science and engineering. She joined ESPOL's faculty in 2001 doing both research and teaching and in 2002 she became a full professor and in 2006 deputy dean.

She became the vice-rector of ESPOL in 2012 when Sergio Flores Macías was the rector. She was also the director of the materials testings and director of the Polytechnic's Center for Research and Development in Nanotechnology.

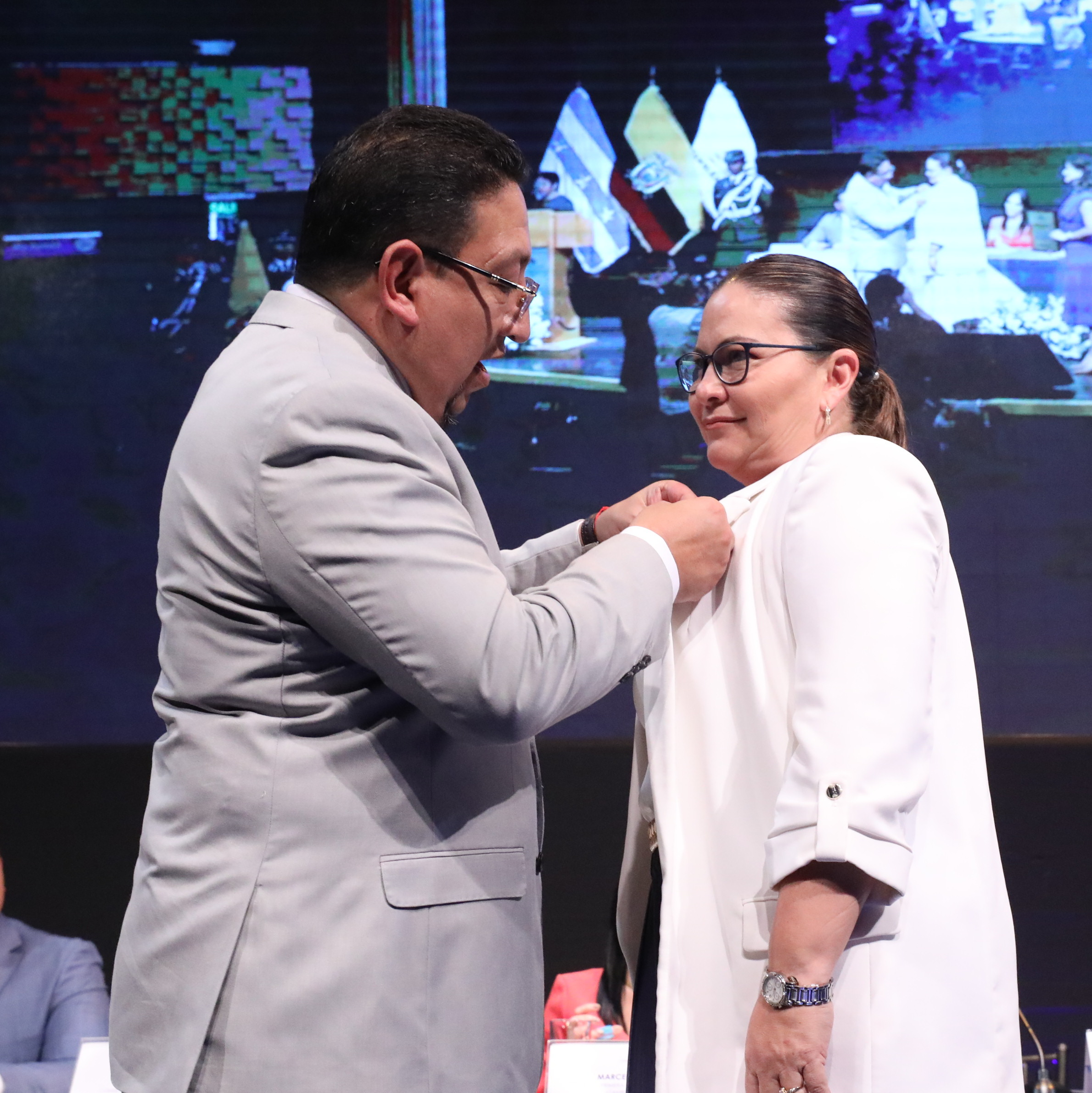
Cecilia Paredes Verduga receives the award from Virgilio Saquicela in Guayaquil, 9 Oct 2022

In 2017 she was promoted to be ESPOL's rector. It was the first time since the ESPOL was founded 59 years ago that it was led by a woman. In 2021 ESPOL was ranked in the top 100 universities in Latin America at number 74.

In 2022 she was re-elected for a second five year term as rector by the students, teaching staff and the employees of ESPOL. She was elected on her manifesto on transforming ESPOL for the digital transformation. Paola Romero Crespo was elected as the vice President.

Guayaquil is an important city in Ecuador as it was involved in the country's move to independence in 1900. In 2022 the National Assembly came to Guayaquil to meet and to celebrate 202 years of independence. During the meeting Verduga was honoured when she was given an award recognising her contribution to education by the President of the National Assembly.

== Private life ==
She is married and they have two children.
