= ESPOL Polytechnic University =

Academic institution in Guayaquil, Ecuador

- Escuela Superior Politécnica del Litoral
- Other name: ESPOL
- Motto: "Ciencia, Tecnología y Educación al servicio del país."
- Motto in English: "Science, Technology, and Education at the nation's service."
- Type: Public
- Established: October 29, 1958; 67 years ago
- President: Cecilia Paredes Verduga
- Vice-president: Paola Romero Ph.D., Carlos Monsalve Ph.D.
- Students: ~12,000
- Location: Guayaquil, Guayas, República del Ecuador; 2.1497°S 79.9600°W
- Campus: Rural and Urban
- Colors: Blue
- Mascot: Galápagos tortoise
- Website: www.espol.edu.ec
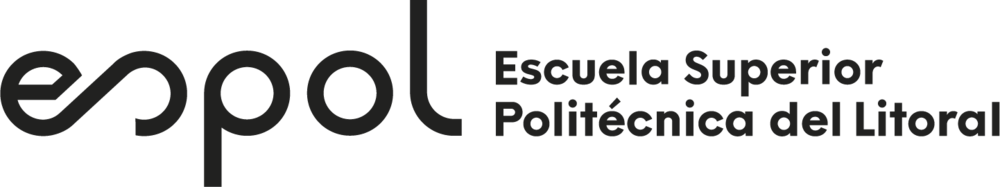

ESPOL Polytechnic University (Spanish: Escuela Superior Politécnica del Litoral; English: Higher Polytechnic School of the Littoral) is a public university in Guayaquil, Ecuador. Established in 1958, the university serves as a premier technical hub, prioritizing comprehensive training and scientific inquiry across the STEM fields.

ESPOL is an autonomous, non-profit institution of higher education with the legal authority to govern its own academic, scientific, technical, administrative, and financial activities in accordance with current Ecuadorian law. It has five faculties or schools, fifteen research centers, and several associated centers providing twenty-six undergraduate and ten master's degrees.

== History ==
The school was created on October 24, 1958, through Executive Decree 1664 by President Camilo Ponce Enriquez, as a higher education institution.

ESPOL was inaugurated on Tuesday, May 19, 1959, and classes began the following Monday, May 25. Its first location was the Casona building of the Universidad de Guayaquil. The area around the historical Peñas area provided a central location in the city, and the buildings in that area were bought by ESPOL with an initial payment of 12 million sucres.

In 1969, the Quinto Guayas Battalion gave ESPOL the area between the Simón Bolívar embankment and Loja Street, where the four engineering departments were located.

In 1973, the Ecuadorian marines moved from their base in Guayaquil, and in their place, new installations for the Facultad de Ingenieria Maritima y Ciencias del Mar were constructed.

Cecilia Paredes Verduga became the vice-rector of ESPOL in 2012, when Sergio Flores Macías was the rector. She was also the director of the materials testings and director of the Polytechnic's Center for Research and Development in Nanotechnology.

In 2017 Cecilia Paredes Verduga was promoted to be ESPOL's rector. It was the first time since ESPOL was founded 59 years ago that it was led by a woman. In 2021, ESPOL was ranked in the top 100 universities in Latin America at number 74.

University rankings

Global – Overall
- QS World: 951-1000 (2026)

In 2022 Cecilia Paredes Verduga was re-elected for a second five-year term as rector by the students, teaching ESPOL staff and employees. She was elected on her manifesto on transforming ESPOL for the upcoming digital revolution. Paola Romero Crespo was elected as the vice President.

=== Campuses ===
In 1995, ESPOL moved from its historic campus to the new campus on the outskirts of the city. The new campus was more than 700 hectares (1,700 acres) in size and included a protected forest that the university took over.

=== Twenty-first century ===
In 2009, ESPOL began construction of the Parque del Conocimiento (Knowledge Park), where the research centers of ESPOL will be located. Also in 2009, ESPOL built buildings to host the prepolitenico (first year general studies). In 2010, ESPOL started the construction of the new EDCON building, currently FADCOM.

== Campuses ==
=== Campus de Peñas ===
2.5 ha in size and located near the historical center of Guayaquil, Las Peñas campus was the center of academic life. Almost everything was moved to the Gustavo Galindo campus for the 2011–2012 academic year.

=== Campus Gustavo Galindo ===
724 ha in size, the Gustavo Galindo Campus is the main and largest campus. Its location on the Via Perimetral highway eases access to commuting students. The central administration of the university and research centers are located there. Its infrastructure is the result of a development plan, the Plan de Desarrollo (1983–1992) as well as the creation of the new PARCON.

=== Campus Via de la Costa ===
The Campus Via de la Costa, located on the coast of the Santa Elena province, hosts the CENAIM-ESPOL Foundation and maritime-related research and degree programs.

== Academics ==
=== Schools and colleges ===
==== COPOL ====
The Polytechnic High School (Colegio Politecnico) is a secondary educational institution linked and colocated with the university. Created in 1995, it is located in the Campus Gustavo Galindo.

==== ESPAE ====
Escuela de Postgrado de Administracion de Empresas. ESPAE's programs are only limited to postgraduate (master's degree) studies.

==== FADCOM ====
Undergraduate academics include the School of Design and Visual Communication of ESPOL (previously known as Escuela de Diseño y Comunicaciónis', currently Faculty), which is associated with the broad field of Arts and Humanities of the International Standard Classification of Education (ISCED).

==== FCSH ====
The Faculty of Social Sciences and Humanities (Facultad de Ciencias Sociales y Humanísticas).

==== FIMCP ====
The Faculty of Mechanical Engineering and Production Sciences (Facultad de Ingenieria Mecánica y Ciencias de la Producción).

==== FCNM ====
The School of Natural Sciences and Math (Facultad de Ciencias Naturales y Matemática).

==== FICT ====
The School of Engineering in Earth Sciences (Facultad de Ingeniería en Ciencias de la Tierra).

==== FIEC ====
The School of Electrical and Computer Engineering (Facultad de Ingenieria Electrica y Computacion). It consists of six departments and offers multiple degrees.

== Research ==
=== Research centers ===
ESPOL research centers include the Center for Systems Research, Development and Innovation (Centro de Investigación, Desarrollo e Innovación de Sistemas, CIDIS); the Information Technology Center (Centro de Tecnologías de Información, CTI), focused onresearch into information and communication technologies; and the Knowledge Park (Parque del Conocimiento, PARCON).

== Notable faculty ==
- Rafael Correa Delgado, President of Ecuador. Visiting professor at FEN from 2001 to 2005.
- María del Pilar Cornejo R. de Grunauer, Secretary National for Risk Management, Ecuador. Researcher FIMCM.
