= Francisco de Vitoria University =

University in Spain

- Universidad Francisco de Vitoria
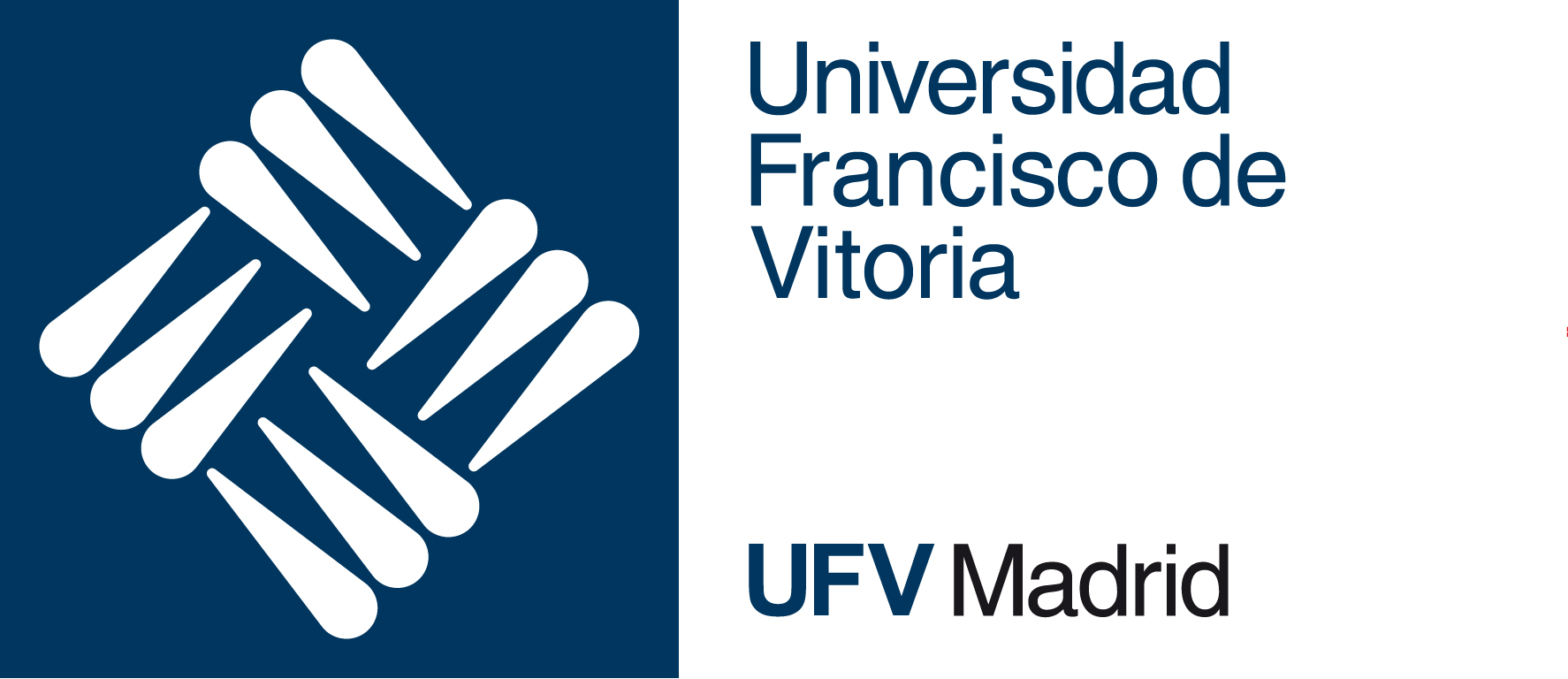
- Motto: Vince in bono malum
- Motto in English: "Defeat Evil with Good"
- Type: Roman Catholic
- Established: 1993
- Affiliations: Legionaries of Christ
- Chancellor: Daniel Sada Castaño
- Vice-Chancellor: Clemente López González and Vicente Lozano Díaz
- Location: Pozuelo de Alarcón, Madrid, Spain; 40.4396°N 3.8355°W
- Website: www.ufv.es

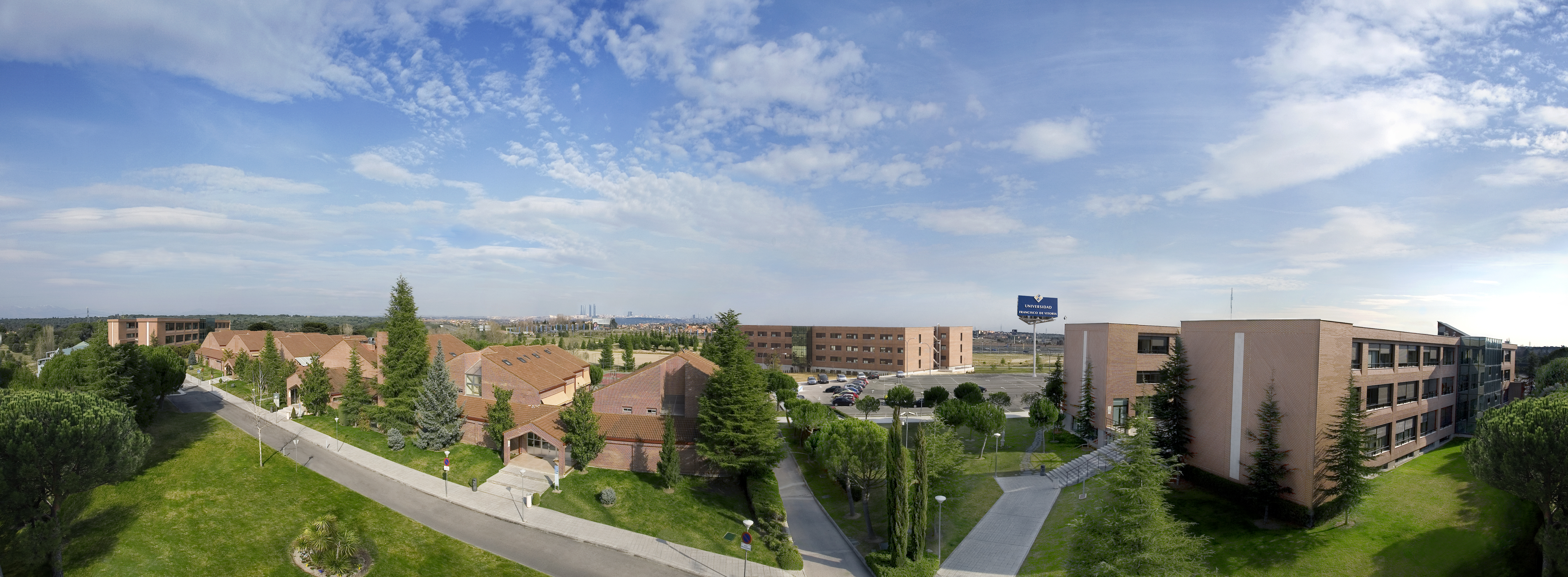
View of campus.

Francisco de Vitoria University (Spanish: Universidad Francisco de Vitoria) is a private university located in Pozuelo de Alarcón, in the Community of Madrid, Spain. It is a Roman Catholic institution run by the Legion of Christ. It is named after Francisco de Vitoria (c. 1483 – 1546), a Spanish philosopher, theologian, and jurist.
