= Technological University of Panama =

University in Panama City, Panama

- Universidad Tecnológica de Panamá (UTP)
- Motto in English: On the way to excellence by means of continuous improvement
- Type: Public
- Established: August 13, 1981
- President: Héctor Montemayor (2018-2023)
- Students: 24,681 (2018)
- Location: Universidad Tecnológica Avenue, Campus Víctor Levi Sasso, Panama City, Panama; 9.023°N 79.531°W
- Website: www.utp.ac.pa

The Technological University of Panama, Universidad Tecnológica de Panamá (UTP) in Spanish, is the second largest university in Panama. It comprises six schools and has seven regional campuses nationwide. The 60-hectare (150-acre) main campus is in Panama City, the country's capital.

== History ==
The Universidad Tecnológica de Panamá (UTP) is the highest hierarchy public institution, regarding higher education in Panama. It was formerly the Engineering School of the University of Panama, which in 1975 became the Polytechnic Institute and, due to the need of a new model of university, became the Universidad Tecnológica de Panamá, by means of Law 18 of August 13, 1981.

On October 9, 1984 the Universidad Tecnológica de Panamá was definitively organized by means of Law 17. Law 57 of July 26, 1996 modifies and adds to Law 17 of 1984.

UTP started with six bachelor's degrees and 15 technical careers. Currently it offers 43 advanced careers, 28 bachelor's degrees and 21 technical careers.

Its current academic offer is the best evidence of institutional growth. There are 131 careers at different levels, as follows: 2 Doctorate studies, 40 master's degrees, 26 postgraduate courses, 1 Professor Career, 4 Specializations, 8 Diplomas, 14 Bachelor's degrees in Engineering, 14 Bachelor's degrees, 8 Bachelor's degrees in Technology and 14 Technical careers. Regarding demand, it has increased from 5,735 students on 1981 to 18,000 on 2011.

It has a Faculty of professors, 30% of them teaching full-time and an administrative crew of 1,200 people.

== Organization ==
- President/Rector
- Academic Vice-Rector
- Administrative Vice-Rector
- Research, Postgraduate Affairs and Extension Vice-Rector
- Registrar's Office
- University Planning
- Government Organisms
  - General University Council
  - Academic Council
  - Research, Postgraduate Affairs and Extension Council
  - Administrative Council

== Schools ==
- Civil Engineering
- Electrical Engineering
- Industrial Engineering
- Mechanical Engineering
- Computer Systems Engineering
- Science and Technology

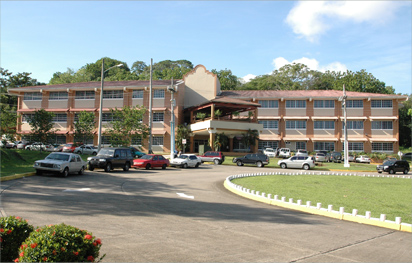
Masters's degree building on the Dr. Victor Levi Sasso Campus

== Branches ==
- Panama City
  - Metropolitan Campus “Dr. Víctor Levi Sasso”
  - Howard
  - Tocumen
- Azuero Regional Center
- Bocas del Toro Regional Center
- Cocle Regional Center
- Colon Regional Center
- Chiriqui Regional Center
- Western Panama Regional Center
- Veraguas Regional Center

== Research centres ==
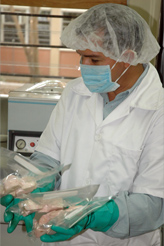
Inside a research center at the UTP

- Engineering Experimental Center (CEI)
- Project Center
- Agricultural Production and Research Center (CEPIA)
- Hydraulic and Hydrotechnical Research Center (CIHH)[
- Research, Development and Innovation in Information and Communications Technology Center

== Communications ==
- Radar Newsletter, publication for the students
- Boletín Dirección de Relaciones Internacionales
- UTP in motion newsletter
- El Tecnológico magazine
- PRISMA Tecnológico magazine
- I+D Tecnológico magazine
- Tecnología Hoy magazine

== Cultural affairs ==
- Book and Magazine Launch
- Cultural Magazine MAGA
- Literature Week
- "Rogelio Sinán" Central American Prize
- "José María Sánchez" Short Story National Prize
- MAGA Short Story Prize
- “Pablo Neruda” National Poetry Prize
- Creative Writing Diploma

== Services ==
- Bookstore and Distribution Center
- Library
- Engineering Career Certification
- Others
