= 1951 in poetry =

Nationality words link to articles with information on the nation's poetry or literature (for instance, Irish or France).

== Events ==
- Poet Cid Corman begins Origin magazine in response to the failure of a magazine that Robert Creeley had planned. The magazine typically features one writer per issue and runs, with breaks, until the mid-1980s. Poets featured include Robert Creeley, Robert Duncan, Larry Eigner, Denise Levertov, William Bronk, Theodore Enslin, Charles Olson, Louis Zukofsky, Gary Snyder, Lorine Niedecker, Wallace Stevens, William Carlos Williams and Paul Blackburn. The magazine also leads to the establishment of Origin Press, which publishes books by a similar range of poets.
- Bad Lord Byron, a film directed by David MacDonald about the Romantic poet.
- Czesław Miłosz, Polish poet, translator, literary critic, future (1980) winner of the Nobel Prize in Literature, becomes an exile this year.
- The Dolmen Press is founded in Dublin, Ireland by Liam and Josephine Miller to provide a publishing outlet for Irish poets and artists. The Press operates in Dublin from 1951 until Liam Miller's death in 1987.

== Works published in English ==
Listed by nation where the work was first published and again by the poet's native land, if different; substantially revised works listed separately:

=== Canada ===
- Irving Layton, The Black Huntsmen: Poems. Montreal.
- Tom MacInnes, In the Old of my Age
- Duncan Campbell Scott, Selected Poems, edited by E. K. Brown
- A. J. M. Smith, The Worldly Muse
- Kay Smith, Footnote to the Lord's Prayer and Other Poems
- Raymond Souster, City Hall Street. Toronto: Ryerson.
- Anne Wilkinson, Counterpoint to Sleep

=== New Zealand ===
- James K. Baxter, Recent Trends in New Zealand Poetry, scholarship
- Allen Curnow, editor, A Book of New Zealand Verse 1923-50, anthology
- Denis Glover, Sings Harry, New Zealand
- M. H. Holcroft, Discovered Isles, scholarship
- Louis Johnson:
  - Editor, New Zealand Poetry Yearbook, first annual edition, anthology
  - The Sun Among the Ruins
  - Roughshod Among the Lilies
- Charles Spear, Twopence Coloured
- Hubert Witheford, The Falcon Mark

=== United Kingdom ===
- W. H. Auden, Nones, including the poem "In Praise of Limestone"
- E. C. Bentley, Clerihews Complete
- Basil Bunting, Seeds, a long poem, published by Poetry magazine
- Roy Campbell, Light on a Dark Horse, autobiography
- Charles Causley:
  - Farewell Aggie Weston
  - Hands to Dance
- Jack Clemo, The Clay Verge
- Keith Douglas, Collected Poems
- Robert Graves, Poems and Satires
- James Kirkup, The Submerged Village, and Other Poems
- John Lehmann, The Age of the Dragon
- Iona and Peter Opie, The Oxford Dictionary of Nursery Rhymes
- Poems of Today, British poetry anthology, fourth series
- Enoch Powell, The Wedding Gift & Dancer’s End (London: Falcon Press,) .
- Anne Ridler, The Golden Bird, and Other Poems
- Alan Ross, Poetry, 1945–1950
- John Wain, Mixed Feelings

=== United States ===
- W. H. Auden, Nones, English-born poet living and published in the United States
- John Malcolm Brinnin, The Sorrows of Cold Stone
- John Ciardi, From Time to Time, including "My Father's Watch"
- Langston Hughes, Montage of a Dream Deferred, including "Harlem"
- Randall Jarrell:
  - Losses, New York: Harcourt, Brace
  - The Seven-League Crutches, New York: Harcourt, Brace
- Hugh Kenner, The Poetry of Ezra Pound, highly influential in causing a re-assessment of Pound's poetry (New Directions), criticism
- Robert Lowell, The Mills of the Kavanaughs, New York: Harcourt, Brace
- James Merrill, First Poems
- Marianne Moore, Collected Poems, winner of both the Pulitzer Prize and the National Book Award for poetry in 1952
- Ogden Nash, Parents Keep Out
- Adrienne Rich, A Change of World, her first volume, selected by W. H. Auden for the Yale Series of Younger Poets
- Theodore Roethke, Praise to the End!, 13 long poems about a child's sensibility and developing consciousness
- Louis Simpson, Good News of Death and Other Poems, Jamaican-born poet living in the United States
- Clark Ashton Smith, The Dark Chateau
- Jean Toomer, Cane
- Theodore Weiss, The Catch
- William Carlos Williams:
  - Paterson, Book IV
  - The Collected Earlier Poems
  - The Autobiography of William Carlos Williams

=== Other in English ===
- Nagendranath Gupta, editor and translator, Eastern Poetry, Allahabad: Indian Press, second edition, Bombay: Hind Kitabs (first edition 1929), anthology; Indian poetry in English
- Louis Simpson, ''Good News of Death and Other Poems, Jamaican-born poet living in the United States
- Rex Ingamells, The Great South Land, Melbourne, a history of Australia from primordial times, Australia

== Works published in other languages ==
=== France ===
- Pierre Jean Jouve, Ode
- Alphonse Métérié, Proella
- Jacques Prévert:
  - Histoires
  - Spectacle
- Jules Supervielle, Naissances
- Frédéric Jacques Temple, Foghorn

=== India ===
In each section, listed in alphabetical order by first name:

- Rajendra Shah, Andolan, Gujarati language
- Binod Chandra Nayak, Oriya:
  - Nilacandrara Upatyaka
  - Candra O tara
- Hem Barua, Balichandra, Indian, Assamese
- Mangalacharan Chattopadhyay, Mergh Brsti Jar, Bengali
- Sumitra Kumari Sinha, Panthini, Hindi-language
- Sundaram, Yatra Gujarati language
- V. A. Anandakkuttan, Dipavali, Malayalam
- Naresh Guha, Duranta Dupur, Bengali
- Ajneya, editor, Dusara Saptak, Hindi, influential anthology in the Nai Kavita ("New Poetry") movement, which has been said to have started with this book, which contains poetry from Bhavani Prasad Misra, Sakunta Mathur, Hari Narayan Vyas, Shamasher Bahadur Singh, Naresh Mehta, Raghuvir Sahay and Dharamvir Bharati (see also Tar Saptak 1943)

=== Other ===
- Simin Behbahani, Seh-tar-e Shekasteh ("The Broken Lute"), Persia
- Alberto de Lacerda, Poemas, Portugal
- Hushang Ebtehaj (H. E. Sayeh) سراب ("Mirage"), Persian poet published in Iran
- Uri Zvi Greenberg, Reḥovot Hanahar ("The Streets of the River"), poems lamenting the loss of Jews in Europe; Hebrew-language, Israel
- Cesare Pavese, Verrà la morte ed avrà i tuoi occhi ("Death Will Come and Will Have Your Eyes"), Turin: Einaudi; Italy

== Awards and honors ==
- Nobel Prize in Literature: Pär Lagerkvist, Swedish poet, author, playwright and writer
- Guggenheim Fellowship awarded to E.E. Cummings
- National Book Award for Poetry: Wallace Stevens, The Auroras of Autumn
- Pulitzer Prize for Poetry: Carl Sandburg, Complete Poems
- Bollingen Prize: John Crowe Ransom
- Canada: Governor General's Award, poetry or drama: The Mulgrave Road, Charles Bruce

== Births ==
Death years link to the corresponding "[year] in poetry" article:

- January 1 – Abul Bashar, Bengali poet and writer
- January 29 – Neil Shepard, American poet, essayist, professor of creative writing and literary magazine editor
- February 23 – Leevi Lehto (died 2019), Finnish poet, translator and programmer
- March 12 – Susan Musgrave, Canadian poet and children's author
- March 21 – Lesley Choyce, Canadian novelist, writer, children's book writer, poet, and academic, founder of Pottersfield Press, host of the television program "Choyce Words" and "Off the Page"; born in the United States and immigrated to Canada in 1979
- April 5 – Lillian Allen, Canadian dub poet
- April 21 – Brigit Pegeen Kelly, American poet and academic, daughter of author Robert Glynn Kelly and married to poet Michael Madonick
- April 22 – Andrew Hudgins, American poet, essayist and academic
- May 2 – Ralph Angel (died 2020), American poet and translator
- May 9:
  - Christopher Dewdney, Canadian poet, writer, artist, creative writing teacher and writer in residence at various universities
  - Jorie Graham, American poet and academic
  - Joy Harjo, Native-American poet, musician and author
- May 30 – Garrett Hongo, American poet and academic, born in Volcano, Hawaii
- June 20:
  - Paul Muldoon Irish poet living in the United States
  - Noel Rowe (died 2007), Australian, poet, writer, academic and Roman Catholic priest in the Marist order
- July 10 – Robert Priest, English-born Canadian poet and children's author
- July 25 – Angela Jackson, African American
- September 13 – Suzanne Lummis, American poet, teacher and co-founder of the Los Angeles Poetry Festival
- October 8 – Jenny Boult, also known as "MML Bliss" (died 2005), Australian
- October 12 – Peter Goldsworthy, Australian poet, novelist, short-story writer, opera librettist and medical practitioner
- November 13 – Robert Hilles, Canadian poet and novelist
- December 13 – Anne-Marie Alonzo (died 2005), Canadian playwright, poet, novelist, critic and publisher
- Also:
  - Robin Becker, American
  - Peter Boyle, Australian
  - Ron Charach, Canadian
  - Peter Christensen, Canadian
  - Stephen Edgar, Australian poet, editor and indexer
  - James Galvin, American poet, novelist and writer
  - Robert Harris (died 1993), Australian
  - Peter Johnson, American
  - Jill Jones, Australian poet and writer
  - Anne Kellas, South African poet, critic and editor, immigrant to Australia
  - Kim Maltman, Canadian poet and physicist
  - Pi O, "П O", Australian poet and anarchist
  - Betsy Struthers, Canadian poet and novelist
  - Ania Walwicz, Australian poet, writer and artist
  - Afaa M. Weaver, American
  - Robert Wrigley, American poet and academic
  - Eddy Yanofsky, American
  - Ray A. Young Bear, American

== Deaths ==
Birth years link to the corresponding "[year] in poetry" article:

- January 17 – Jyoti Prasad Agarwala (born 1903), playwright, songwriter, poet, writer and film maker; Indian, writing in Assamese
- January 31 – Seemab Akbarabadi سیماب اکبرآبادی (born 1882) Urdu poet from India
- April 3 – Henrik Visnapuu (born 1890), Estonian
- June 18 – Angelos Sikelianos (born 1884), Greek
- June 28 – Fumiko Hayashi 林 芙美子 (born 1903 or 1904; sources disagree), novelist, writer and poet (a woman; surname: Hayashi)
- July 3 – Sydney Jephcott (born 1864), Australian poet
- July 21 – Kaykobad (born 1857), Bengali poet
- September 18 – Gelett Burgess (born 1866), American artist, art critic, poet, author, and humorist
- November 13 – Hertha Kräftner (born 1928), German
- December 4 – Pedro Salinas (born 1891), Spanish

== See also ==
- Poetry
- List of poetry awards
- List of years in poetry
