= Frank Samperi =

American poet 1933–1991)

Frank Samperi (1933–1991) was an American poet born in New York.

== Life ==
Frank Samperi was born in Brooklyn, New York, the illegitimate child of an Italian mother who died when he was 11. After two years in an orphanage, he was brought up by aunts. At 20 he enlisted and was sent to fight in the Korean War where he eventually suffered a nervous breakdown due to battlefield trauma and was honorably discharged. He then returned to Brooklyn, where he began writing the poems of his first collection, Song Book. After attending a writing workshop he met the poet Louis Zukofsky, who became an early mentor and also introduced him to Cid Corman. Having married, Samperi took a teaching position in Japan in 1964. There the connection with Corman was renewed and resulted in his poems being championed in Origin (magazine) and published in limited editions from Kyoto. He shortly returned to Brooklyn, completing one poetic trilogy (published between 1971–73) and working on a six-part composition titled COMPREHENSOR Viator, only parts of which were published in limited editions. In the early 1980s Samperi moved to Sun City, Arizona, but declining health prevented him from writing much more before his death at the age of 58. His early poetry was a luminous notation of things seen, pared down in language and form –

no greater vista
than the inward
opening

out

and beyond

This laid the groundwork of an eventual religious vision based on Dante's Divine Comedy and the philosophy of Thomas Aquinas.

== Bibliography ==
- Song Book (J & E Press) W. Babylon NY, 1960 [collected in The Prefiguration]
- Ferns (xerox format), 1965 [collected in The Prefiguration]
- Of Light (Will Petersen) Kyoto, Japan 1965 [collected in The Prefiguration]
- Branches (Will Petersen) Kyoto, Japan 1965 [collected in The Prefiguration]
- Morning and Evening (portfolio with stoneprints by Will Petersen) 1967 [collected in The Prefiguration]
- Crystals (Caterpillar V) CA, 1967 [collected in The Prefiguration]
- Euphrasy, 1967 [a section of Quadrifariam]
- The man dying the flame 1969 [a poem collected in The Triune]
- Anamnesis, 1969 [a section of Quadrifariam]
- The Triune (J & E Press) W.Babylon NY, 1969. [a section of Quadrifariam]
- The Prefiguration (Grossman) New York, 1971, with cover and endprints by Will Petersen. The first of a trilogy made up of the two volumes following. available online
- Grossman (1971). Quadrifariam (PDF). New York.
- Grossman (1973). Lumen Gloriae (PDF). New York.
- The Fourth (Elizabeth Press) Kyoto, Japan 1973.
- Infinitesimals (Elizabeth Press) Kyoto, Japan 1974. This was the first part of Lumen Gloriae.
- Alfa ed O (Origin Press) Kyoto, Japan 1976. The fifth part of COMPREHENSOR Viator.
- Sanza Mezzo (Elizabeth Press) New Rochelle NY, 1977.
- The Kingdom (Arc Publications) Todmorden, Lancs, UK, 1979. The first part of COMPREHENSOR Viator.
- A Remotis (Querencia Books) US, 1979.
- Letargo (Station Hill/Barrytown Ltd) New York, 1980. The sixth and last part of COMPREHENSOR Viator.
- One Ascends (Station Hill Press), Barrytown NY, 1980. A two-color postcard.
- The Bow Window (Origin Press) Kyoto, Japan 1986.
- Senno: from Dante's Inferno (Morning Star Publications; folded broadsheet with illustrations by Ron Costley), Edinburgh, Scotland, 1992
- Samperi—Dante: Frank Samperi's translations of the first two cantos of Dante's Paradiso, with an introductory essay by Harry Gilonis (Form Books) London, UK, 1993
- 1991 Circulazion (Tel-Let) Charleston IL, 1996
- Manifestatio (Tel-Let) Charleston IL, 1996. The third part of COMPREHENSOR Viator.
- Samperi, Frank (1998). Day (PDF). The estate of Frank Samperi.
- Cottage in Pines Wider and Deeper (Kater Murr's Press) London, 1998
- The New Heaven Now (Longhouse) Green River VT, 2002. Accordion booklet with decorated band text online.
- Sappunta (Hawkhaven Press) San Francisco CA, 2004. Cover illustration by William Cirocco.
- Spiritual Necessity: Selected Poems Of Frank Samperi (Station Hill/Barrytown Ltd) NY, 2004, Ed. John Martone 17 page excerpt

== Sources ==
- Cid Corman: 120 letters to Frank Samperi (1972–75)
- John Martone (ed.): Frank Samperi’s Lamentations, Italian Americana 2 (2003): 177–184. Excerpts from the diary kept from 1963 to 1965 by Samperi 'contribute to a better understanding of his poetry, especially his vision of a culture based on individual difference, not on economic or political hierarchies.'
- O'Leary, Peter: Reversion and the Turning Thither: Writing Religious Poetry and the Case of Frank Samperi, Logos: A Journal of Catholic Thought and Culture – Volume 7, Number 2, Spring 2004, pp. 54–85.
- J. Townsend: Spiritual Man, Modern Man – The Poetics of Frank Samperi, Jacket 36 (Late 2008)
