= John Taggart =

American poet and critic (born 1942)

John Taggart (born 1942) is an American poet and critic.

== Biography ==
He was born in Guthrie Center, Iowa. He graduated with honors in 1965 from Earlham College in Indiana, earning a B.A. in English Literature and Philosophy. In 1966 he received a M.A. in English Literature and Creative Writing from the University of Chicago, and in 1974 he completed a Ph.D. in the Humanities Interdisciplinary Studies Program at Syracuse University.

During the late 1960s and early 1970s, Taggart was the editor and publisher of Maps, an acclaimed literary magazine. In 1978, edited an issue of "Truck" devoted to the work of Theodore Enslin. His work has been widely published and anthologized, and as far back as 1978 his unique style was exerting an influence over his peers, poets such as Rachel Blau DuPlessis and Gil Ott.

For many years he was Professor of English and Director of the Interdisciplinary Arts Program at Shippensburg University; he retired in 2001.

== Overview ==
Taggart's approach to the poem is strongly rooted in Objectivist poetics, particularly the works of Louis Zukofsky and George Oppen. Unlike most others of his generation whose poetries sprung from similar influences, Taggart stayed away from, on the one hand, the mainstream variations of the neatly packaged imagistic poem, and, on the other hand, the aggressively language-centered writing that foregrounded the materiality of text over the voice of the author.

== Works ==
Poetry

- To Construct a Clock (Elizabeth Press, 1971)
- The Pyramid Is Pure Crystal (Elizabeth Press, 1974)
- Prism and the Pine Twig (Elizabeth Press, 1977)
- Dodeka (Membrane, 1979)
- Peace On Earth (Turtle Island, 1981)
- Dehiscence (Membrane, 1983)
- Loop (Sun and Moon, 1991)
- Standing Wave (Lost Roads, 1993)
- When the Saints (Talisman House, 1999)
- Pastorelles (Flood Editions, 2004)
- Crosses: Poems 1992-1998 (Stop Press, 2006)
- There Are Birds (Flood Editions, 2008)
- Is Music: Selected Poems (Copper Canyon Press, 2010)

Prose

- Remaining in Light: Ant Meditations on a Painting by Edward Hopper (1993, SUNY Press)
- Songs of Degrees: Essays on Contemporary Poetry and Poetics (1994, University Alabama Press)

== Sources ==
For further research see:

- The John Taggart Papers, 1962–2002 at UC–San Diego
- John Taggart Papers 1965–1974 at Syracuse University
- The John Taggart (re: Maps) Archive at NYU
- Finding aid for the John Taggart Papers at the University of Connecticut Archives and Special Collections
