= René Taupin =

French translator

René Taupin (French: [topɛ̃]; 1905 – 13 February 1981) was a French translator, critic, and academic who lived most of his life in the United States and is best known for heading the Romance Languages department at Hunter College.

== Life ==
Taupin moved to the United States in the 1920s. Taupin taught at Haverford College and Columbia University. In the 1930s, he began teaching at Hunter College. In 1954, Taupin was appointed chairman of the Department of Romance Languages at Hunter College. He remained at Hunter until 1968, when he retired. After his retirement, he returned to Paris, where he spent the last 13 years of his life. He died age 76 and was survived by his wife, Sidonia.

== Career ==
He wrote his major work in 1929, in which he compared the effects of Symbolist poems with those of Imagist poems and the different uses of imagery, noting of the Imagists 'the pleasure of their poetry is not the satisfaction of discovering little by little, but of seizing at a single blow, in the fullest vitality, the image, a fusion of reality in words' and concluding 'between the image of the Imagist and the 'symbol' of the Symbolists there is a difference only of precision'

Taupin corresponded with Ezra Pound and was an associate of Louis Zukofsky (who also corresponded with Pound). Zukofsky and Taupin planned to publish a periodical La France en liberté, but their plans did not come to fruition.

Indiana University's Lilly Library Manuscript Collections has correspondence of Taupin's that includes letters from Zukofsky.

Paul Mariani said about Taupin that he was "a bitter pill for us to swallow sometimes" because he made Americans "look a rather negative lot".

== Works ==
=== Books ===
- The Influence of French Symbolism on Modern American Poetry (1986), Ams Studies in Modern Literature, ISBN 0-404-61579-1
- The Writing of Guillaume Apollinaire/Le Style Apollinaire: Le Style Apollinaire (1934), with Louis Zukofsky, Sasha Watson, Jean Daive, and Serge Gavronsky, Univ Press of New England, ISBN 0-8195-6620-9; (Hardcover ISBN 0-8195-6619-5)

=== Essays ===
- Essais Indifferents Pour Une Esthetique, with by Bettina L. Knapp, and Hannah K. Charney, Peter Lang Pub Inc, ISBN 0-8204-0414-4

== See also ==
- Ezra Pound
- Louis Zukofsky
- Guillaume Apollinaire
