= Unmuzzled OX =

Unmuzzled OX was a quarterly of poetry, art and politics founded in 1971 by poet Michael Andre, edited in New York City and Kingston, Ontario. Aided by artist Erika Rothenberg, the best-known issue was The Poets' Encyclopedia, the world's basic knowledge transformed by 225 poets, artists, musicians and novelists. The circulation of Unmuzzled OX peaked at 25,000 in the 1980s with The Cantos (121-150) Ezra Pound. Regular contributors to Unmuzzled OX included Allen Ginsberg, Andy Warhol, John Cage, Daniel Berrigan, Eugene McCarthy, Margaret Atwood, Denise Levertov, Robert Peters, Robert Creeley and Gregory Corso. OX frequently featured photographs of contributors by Gerard Malanga. Unmuzzled OX was located near the World Trade Center, and a translation by W. H. Auden of an opera by Carlo Goldoni appeared shortly before September 11, 2001. The publication ran until 2001, and most publications are still available.

== Bibliography ==
- Unmuzzled OX (volume 1-17; New York, N.Y. and Kingston, Ont.; 1971-) ISSN 0049-5557
