= Michael Andre =

Canadian disc jockey

Michael Andre (born August 31, 1946) is a Canadian, disc jockey, poet, critic and editor living in New York City.

Andre was born in Halifax, Nova Scotia, to a civil engineer doing wartime work on a military hospital. His mother's father was a newspaperman, Eyton Warburton; he died when Andre was an infant. Andre was raised in Kingston, Ontario. He studied at McGill University (Honors English, B.A., 1968), the University of Chicago (M.A., 1969) and Columbia University (PhD, English and Comparative Literature, 1973).

Andre hosted radio shows in Chicago and New York. He interviewed, published, and occasionally socialized with W. H. Auden and Eugene McCarthy, Beats like Gregory Corso, William S. Burroughs and Allen Ginsberg, and homosexual esthetes like John Cage and Andy Warhol. He is divorced from Erika Rothenberg, an artist, and Jane Adler, a flautist and sign-language interpreter; he has a son, Benjamin Eyton Andre. Papers are found at the University of Tulsa and at Yale University Library.

Andre is the editor of Unmuzzled OX, an occasional magazine of poetry, art and politics which began in 1971 as a quarterly and has produced 16 volumes. Andre edited and published two books by Gregory Corso, Earth Egg and Writings from OX. His opera, Orfreo, with music by Elodie Lauten, premiered at Merkin Hall in 2004. The two also collaborated on Sex and Pre-anti-post-modernism and S.O.S. W.T.C. He has two widely available anthologies of selected poems: Studying the Ground for Holes (1978) and Experiments in Banal Living (1998). He has worked as a critic for The Montreal Gazette, Art News, Art in America and The Village Voice. His autobiographical essay was published in 1991 by Gale.

In addition to being a poet and editor, Andre was involved with social issues beginning in Paris in 1967 and sometimes appears as a Catholic homme de gauche. "A jackrabbit, if it could read [Andre's poetry]", according to Daniel Berrigan, poet and Catholic Worker, "would jump for glee. And if it could talk to itself, wd. undoubtedly be heard saying, 'Demme, wish I'd thought of that!'"

Andre has recited his poetry in London, Frankfurt and Paris, at various venues in New York including the Public Theater, St. Mark's Poetry Project, and the Bowery Poetry Club as well as at numerous universities and galleries throughout Canada and the United States. Since 1992, Andre has written a column called "New York Letter" for the Small Press Review.

== Interviews ==
Interviews with W. H. Auden, Denise Levertov, Robert Creeley, James Wright, Allen Ginsberg, James Dickey, and Corso with scholarly commentary were accepted as his doctoral dissertation at Columbia in 1973. The interviews with Levertov, Creeley and Corso have been reprinted in a number of different periodicals. The Levertov interview first appeared in The Little Magazine; the others first appeared in Unmuzzled OX. Warhol interviews appeared in Small Press Review, ART News and Unmuzzled OX. The Berrigan interview was commissioned by Warhol for his magazine, then rejected for its political content, and appeared in Unmuzzled OX. Tapes of radio broadcasts with Patti Smith, Charles Bukowski and others are at the University of Tulsa. An interview about Jackie Curtis is in Superstar in a Housedress, the HBO documentary and subsequent Penguin book.

== Poetry ==
- 1974: Xmas Present. New York: Mimeo
- 1975: My Regrets. Minneapolis: Pentagram
- 1978: Studying the Ground for Holes. New York: Release
- 1979: Letters Home. Montreal: Cross Country
- 1981: Jabbing the Asshole is High Comedy. New York: Print Center
- 1990: It as It. New York: Money for Food
- 1998: Experiments in Banal Living. Montreal: Empyreal
- 2004: Unmuzzled in Paris. Paris: Lalande Digital
- 2006: Scratched Lens. Key West, FL: Cycle

=== Notes ===
For the milieu and the contretemps with Warhol, see: "Ezra Pound's Interview" Unmuzzled OX (Volume XII, Number 3, 1988) p. 95

Robert Creeley "43 Poems in 4 Sections, with 18 poems in couplets, written between 1968 and 1978" (Release Press, Brooklyn, 1979)
