= Allan Graham =

American artist

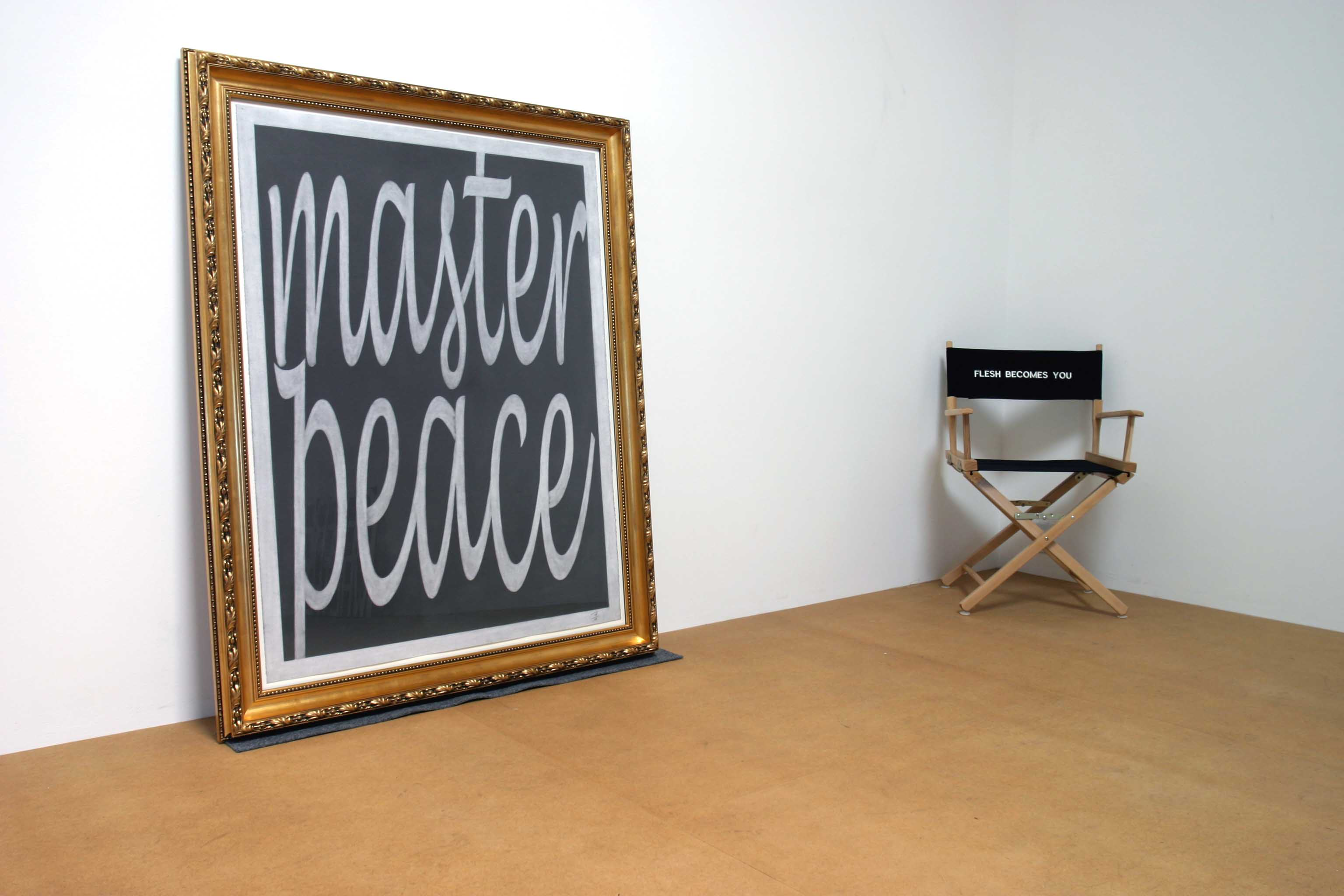
Allan Graham, Studio, 2009

Allan Graham, known also as Toadhouse, (born 1943 in San Francisco, California) is a contemporary American artist based in New Mexico. His work includes sculpture, painting, poetry, and video.

== Biography ==
Graham studied at the San Francisco Art Institute and San José State University before moving to Albuquerque, New Mexico, where he received a Bachelor of Fine Arts from the University of New Mexico (1967).

His early paintings were wall-like grids which, in the mid to late 1970s, developed into more open compositions with sweeping arcs and herring-bone patterns.

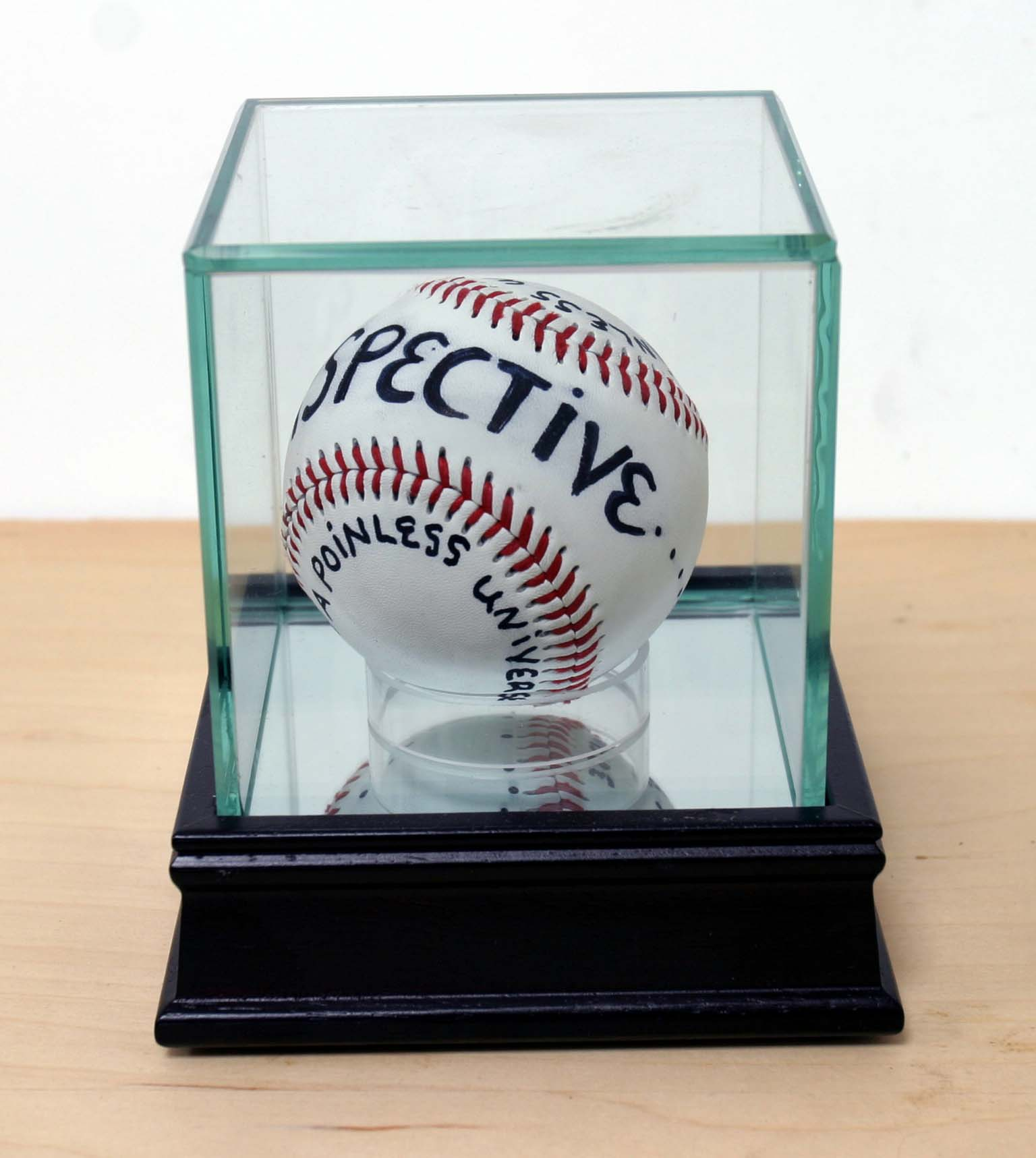
PERSPECTIVE in a poinless universe, 2010

In 1983, he abandoned conventionally shaped canvases in favor of eccentric forms and began leaving the stretcher bars exposed. By the mid-1980s this had evolved into a series of painting-sculpture hybrids, using wood, canvas, newspaper and book pages, which resembled certain African works. These were followed by near-monochromes on bent canvasses, sculptures made of books and irregularly circular paintings using book pages from sources such as a Navajo Bible and Dante's Inferno.

In the 1990s, he painted a series called "Cave of Generation", which consisted of steps leading into large monochrome and two-tone paintings. These were followed by a series titled "Pre-hung (for those who suffer form)" which consisted of single and double doors painted with a palette knife.

== Toadhouse ==
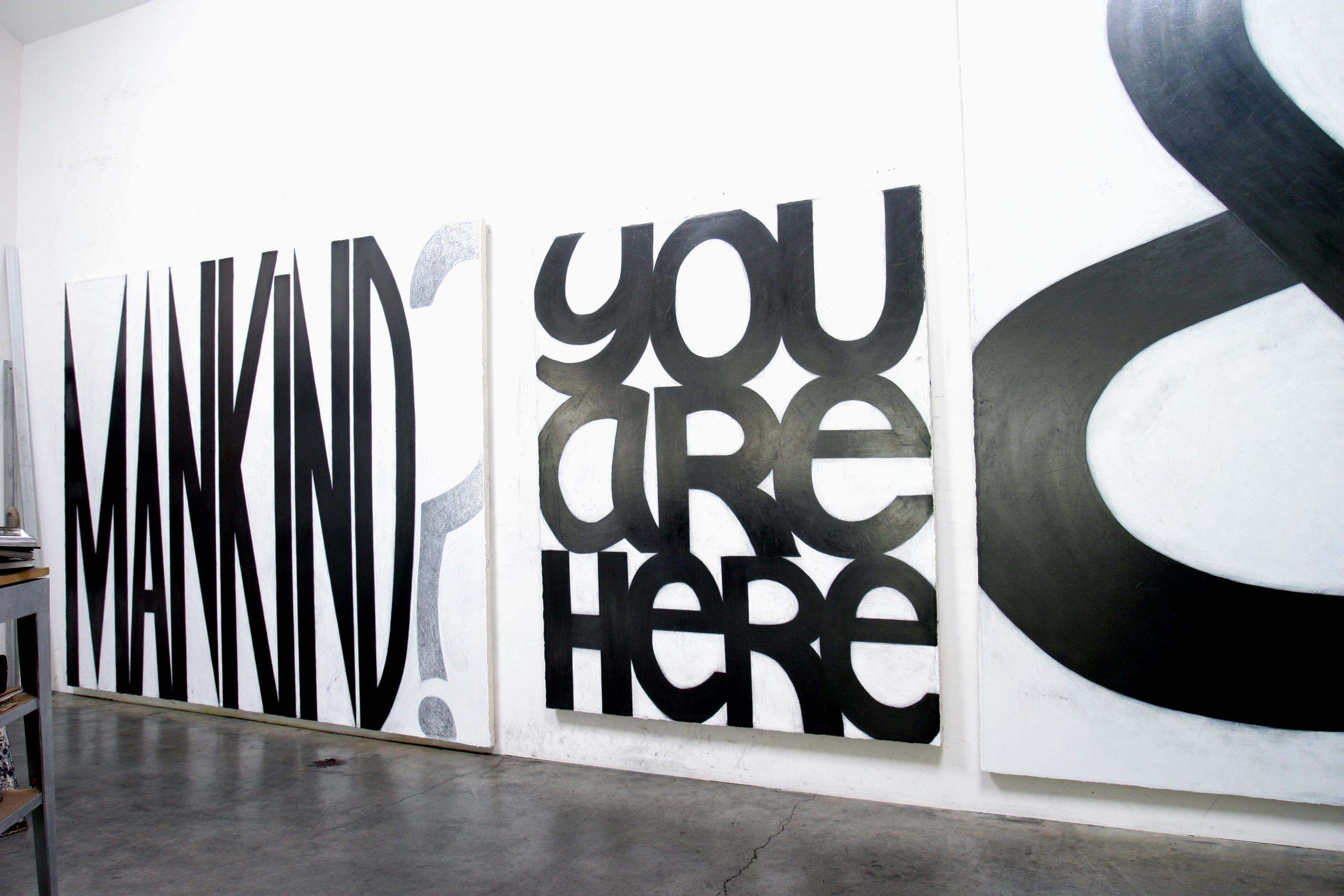
Studio, 2007

In 1990 his work began to appear under the pseudonym of Toadhouse, which came from an underground structure he and his son built in Albuquerque, New Mexico, which attracted toads. The works under the Toadhouse name are word based. In one series he pasted bumper stickers with haiku like slogans on re-chromed car bumpers. In his Cosmo-logical and UFO series, he used tiny words written in graphite.

In an interview done with Graham in The Brooklyn Rail, art critic John Yau said:

I think what goes on in your work is this incredible compression that we have to unpack, and, as we unpack it, we have to deal with our own sense of what these words mean to us or how they have some aspect of our habit of thinking, and then maybe take it apart a little.

In addition to physical artwork, two books of Toadhouse poems have been published: Shit Floats Life Goes On (Toadhouse, 1990) and Visual Eyes, Translations from Toadhouse (Ethan J. Wagner, San Francisco, 1991). His poems have also appeared in In Company, an anthology of New Mexico poets after 1960 (University of New Mexico Press, 2004).

== Influences ==
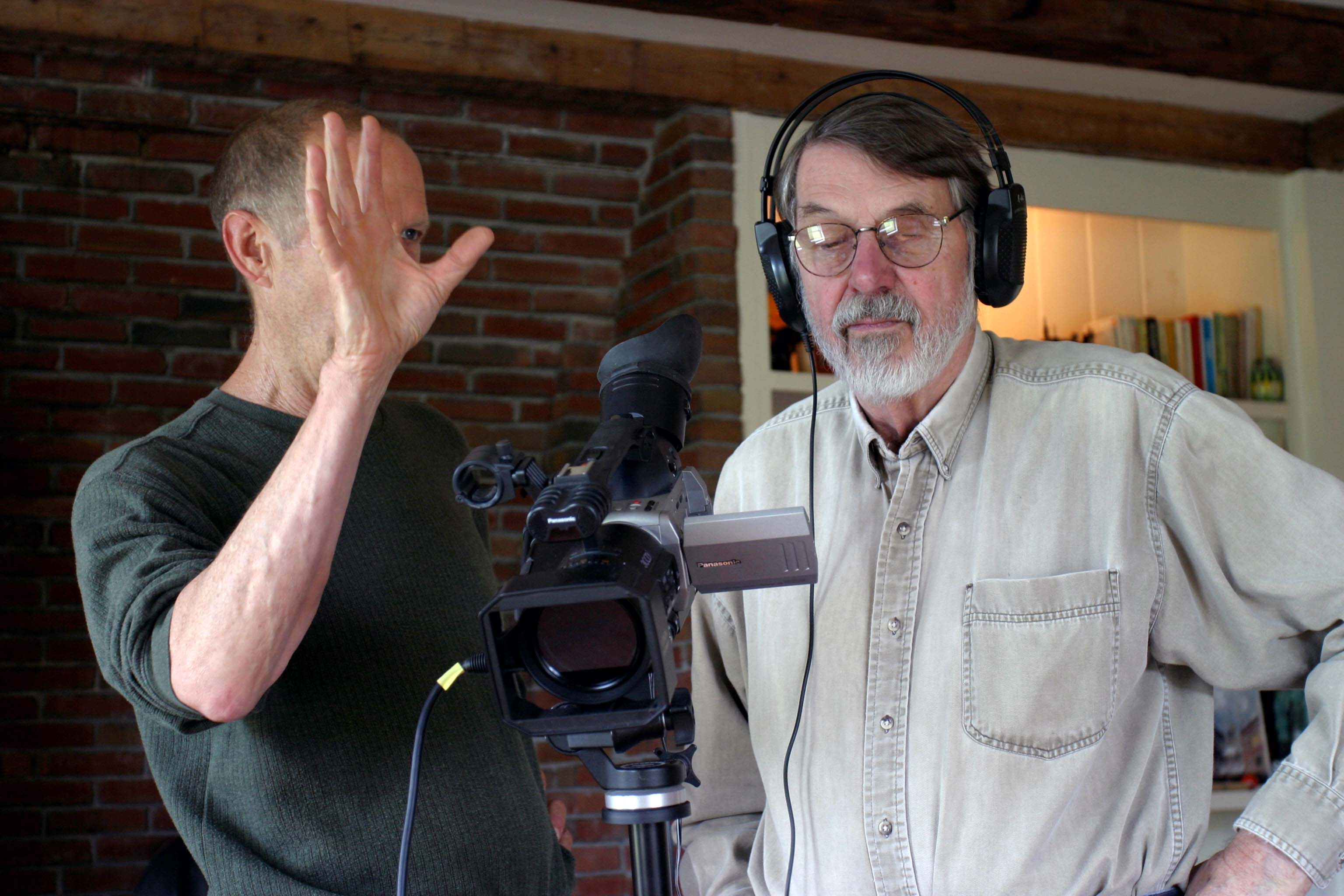
Allan Graham and Robert Creeley, during the taping of "Add-Verse", 2004, photo by Gloria Graham

Graham has been influenced by Zen Buddhism and Buddhist poetry. A large installation piece titled Time is Memory, which appeared in SITE Santa Fe, included sixteen zafus in front of which were placed famous Buddhist death poems. He has also cited Robert Creeley as an influence. The latter was also part of a video, poetry, photo installation project called “Add-Verse” which he did in conjunction with artist Gloria Graham, his spouse.

== Public collections ==
- Albright-Knox Art Gallery, Buffalo, New York, United States
- Denver Art Museum, Denver, Colorado, United States
- Fisher Landau Center, Long Island City, New York, United States
- High Museum of Art, Atlanta, Georgia, United States
- Museo Cantonale d'Arte (now MASI Lugano), Lugano, Svizzera
- Museo di arte moderna e contemporanea di Trento e Rovereto, Rovereto, Italy
- Museum of Albuquerque, Albuquerque, New Mexico, United States
- Museum of Fine Arts, Santa Fe, Santa Fe, New Mexico, United States
- Pérez Art Museum Miami, Miami, Florida, United States
- Roswell Museum and Art Center, Roswell, New Mexico, United States
- Sheldon Memorial Art Museum, University of Nebraska, Lincoln, Nebraska, United States
- University of New Mexico Art Museum, Albuquerque, New Mexico, United States
- Villa Menafoglio Litta Panza, Varese, Italy
