= The Dodd Center for Human Rights =

UConn center focusing on human rights

Coordinates: 41.8056°N 72.2511°W

The Dodd Center for Human Rights

The Dodd Center for Human Rights (formerly the Thomas J. Dodd Research Center) is a University of Connecticut center which supports programming, educational initiatives, and events dedicated to the theme of human rights. The complex is located on the main UConn campus in Storrs, Connecticut.

The Dodd Center also houses several University of Connecticut departments and centers, including Archives & Special Collections, a unit of the University of Connecticut Library, the Human Rights Institute, and the Center for Judaic Studies and Contemporary Jewish Life. The John P. McDonald Reading Room is the public access point for the university archives and special collections.

== Architecture ==
The facility, designed by Jeff Sells of the Connecticut-based architectural firm Fletcher-Thompson, varies from one to three stories, comprising approximately 60,000 square feet of space. The curved entrance facade defines a circular arrival plaza, set along an established pedestrian path, which in turn accesses the main plaza of the Babbidge Library, situated near the center of the campus.

The brick building, modern in design, provides access and physical security, ranging from welcoming visitors’ areas to sequestered, environmentally monitored and secure vault spaces, housing research media and irreplaceable documents.

The Dodd Center won the “American School and University” Architectural Award, Gold Citation, and has subsequently served as a successful model for archival research, and public programming facilities.

== History ==
Ground was broken for the Thomas J. Dodd Research Center on October 10, 1993, and the finished building was dedicated by President Bill Clinton on October 15, 1995. It is named for the late Senator Thomas Joseph Dodd whose son, Senator Christopher J. Dodd, played a crucial role in the center's development. The dedication ceremony inaugurated "The Dodd Year", a year-long series of special events, speakers, exhibits, and colloquia. Devoted to the theme of human rights, The Dodd Year recalled Thomas Dodd's participation as a senior prosecutor in the International Military Tribunal, the first of the Nuremberg War Crimes Trials.

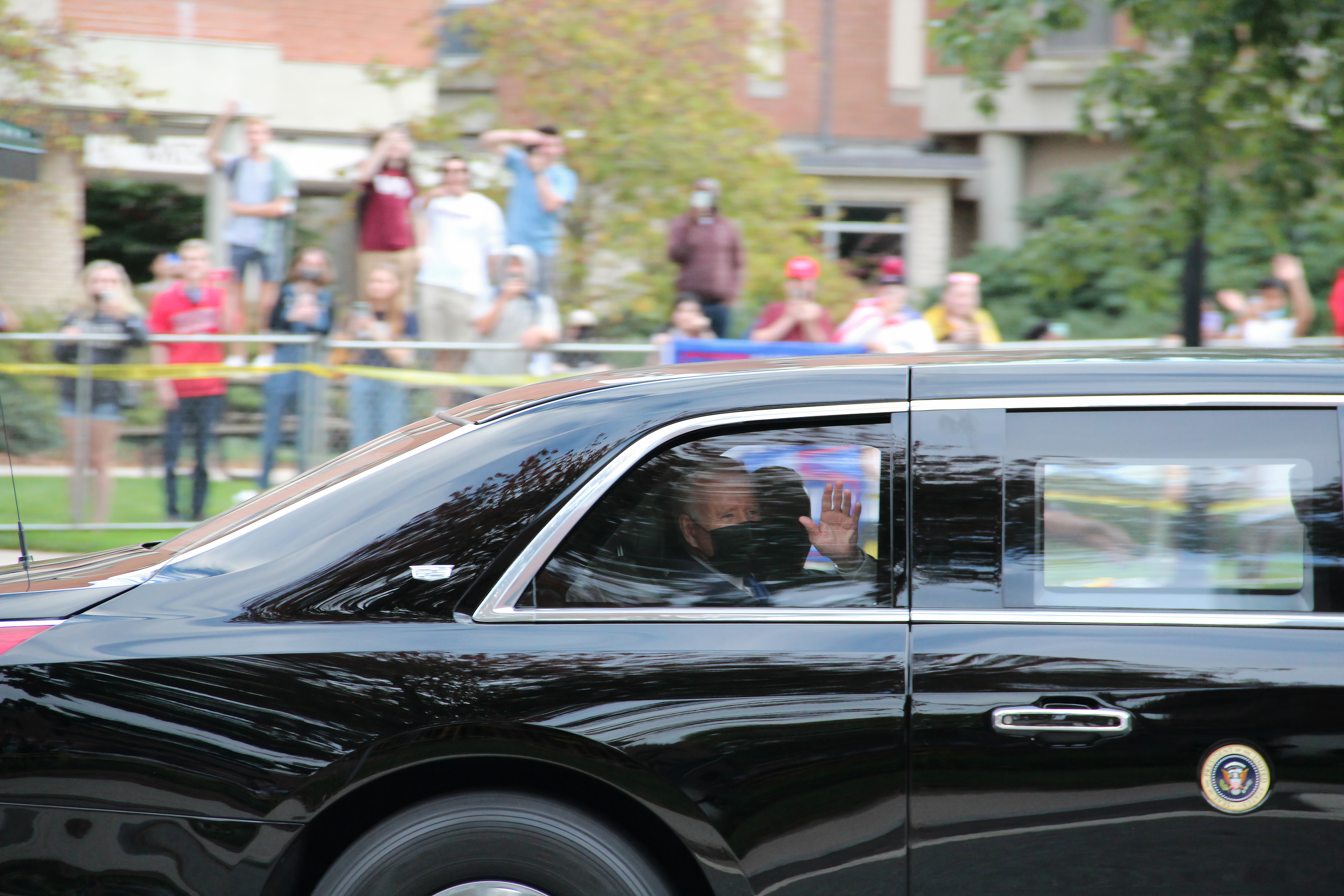
President Biden at UConn

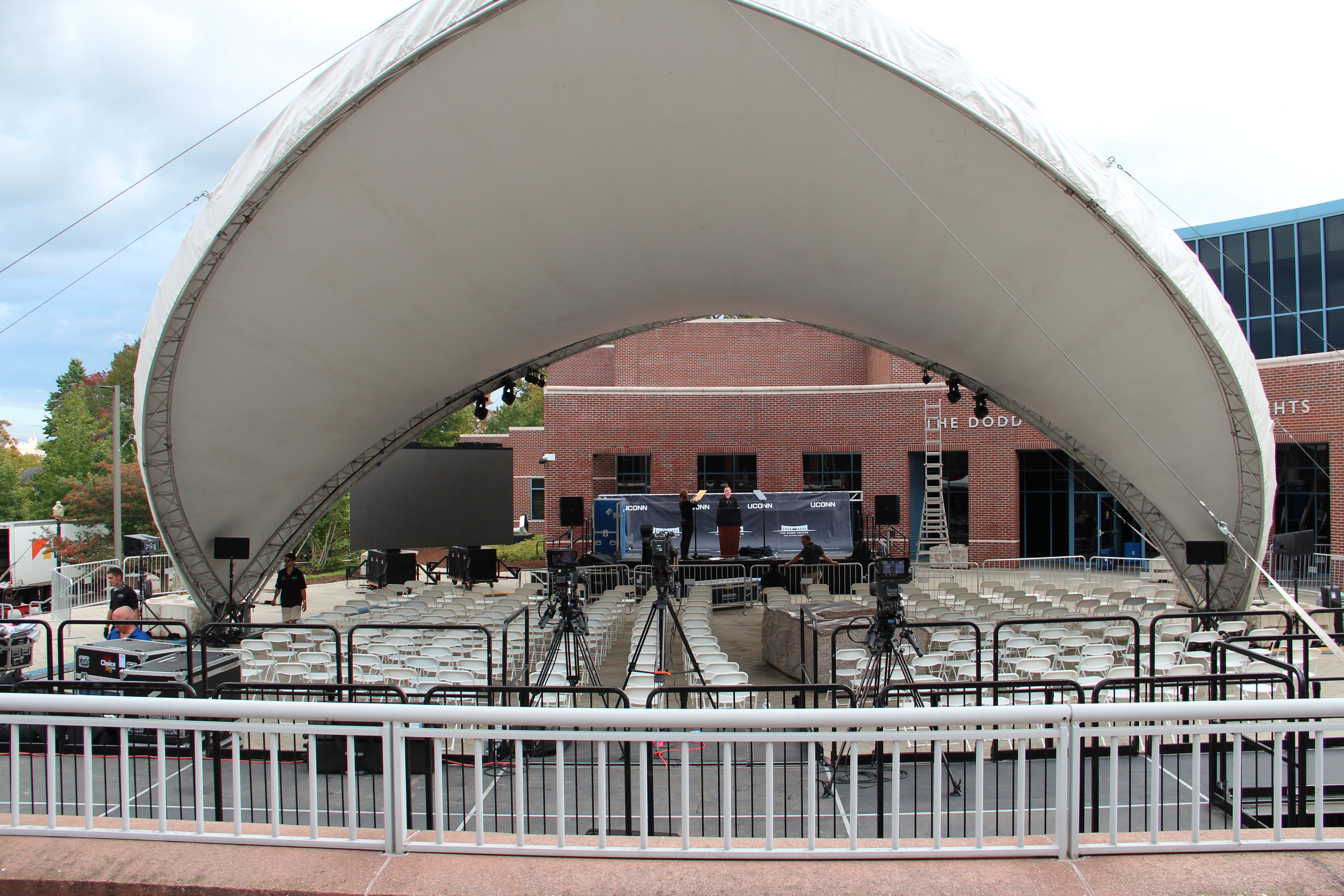
Dodd Center plaza

The Dodd Year program brought an array of world figures to campus including Madeleine Albright, Elie Wiesel, and Oscar Arias and concluded in the fall of 1996 with an address by Mikhail Gorbachev.

In August 2021, the University of Connecticut Board of Trustees voted to rededicate the center as the Dodd Center for Human Rights. President Joe Biden, accompanied by Connecticut governor Ned Lamont, former senator Christopher Dodd, and other political dignitaries rededicated the center in a ceremony on October 15, 2021, exactly 26 years after its original iteration's dedication.

== Programs ==
The Dodd Center for Human Rights hosts a number of ongoing programs and events.

The Raymond and Beverly Distinguished Sackler Lecture in Human Rights is held twice a year. Past speakers include Dorothy Q. Thomas, Adam Fairclough, Charlotte Bunch, Harold Koh, Patricia Wald, Samantha Power, Michael Ignatieff, George Mitchell, and James Crawford. The Thomas J. Dodd Prize in International Justice and Human Rights, first awarded in 2003, is given biennially to an individual or organization which has made a significant contribution towards international justice and human rights. The 2009 Dodd Prize was awarded to the Committee to Protect Journalists on October 5, 2009.

The Edwin Way Teale Lecture Series brings a variety of distinguished speakers to the University of Connecticut to speak on various aspects of nature and the environment.
