= Origin (magazine) =

Origin was an American poetry magazine that was founded in 1951 by Cid Corman. The magazine provided an early platform for the work of Charles Olson, Robert Creeley, Gary Snyder, Theodore Enslin and other important, ground-breaking poets, who collectively created an alternative to academic poetry.

== History and profile ==
Cid Corman, the publisher and editor of the magazine, recruited Charles Olson as a contributing editor when he started it. Their correspondence was printed in 1969 as Letters For Origin. "This collection details an enormous battle of creative energy", during the founding process of this magazine.

Olson's "In Cold Hell, In Thicket" featured in Origin, no. 8 (1953). Through the Origin Press Corman published Louis Zukofsky's key work, A 1–12 (Ashland, 1959) and his novel It Was (1961). William Bronk's first book, Light and Dark, was published in 1956, Gary Snyder's Riprap, in 1959. Corman published translation of classic Japanese poetry like Matsuo Bashō's Cool Melon (1959) and poetry by Shinpei Kusano (1903–88), Selected Frogs (1963). Among Cid Corman's own books, Sun Rock Man, (Origin Press, 1962) is singled out by Michael Carlson of the Guardian as "his best collection of poetry". The anthology The Gist of Origin, 1951–71 (Grossman, 1979) "remains a groundbreaking work."

Corman edited the magazine from 1951 to 1984 (with some interruptions), even when he was abroad studying at the Sorbonne in Paris and translating Paul Celan (1954), taught English in Matera, Italy or lived in Kyoto, Japan. The first series was published in Dorchster, Mass. (20 issues, Spring 1951 – Winter 1957), the second and third in Kyoto (14 issues, April 1961- July 1964 and 20 issues from April 1966 to 1971). The fourth series in Boston (20 issues, October 1977 – July 1982), the fifth from Orono, Maine, (6 issues, Fall 1983-January 1986).

In late 2003 Corman, after his trip to Milwaukee and Lorine Niedecker Centenary USA visit, conceived the idea of Origin's Sixth Series. He designed this to be both an online and printed edition of the magazine. Upwards of twenty issues were planned in collaborative assistance with Chuck Sandy, a newly found friend and educator who resided in Japan. Unfortunately, Corman only sketched out Origin Sixth Series issues 1–4, instead of his intended twenty issues. These proposed ideas came with only brief notes, recommendations, and plans for the featured poets.

Cid Corman died in 2004. The magazine published Corman's skeletal notes about the physical and online magazine.

== Archival collection ==
The Origin Archive is housed in the Fales Library at New York University.
