= The Wedge (poetry collection) =

Book by William Carlos Williams

First edition frontispiece

The Wedge is a 1944 book of poems by American modernist writer and poet William Carlos Williams. He assembled this collection in response to requests from American servicemen during World War II for a pocket-sized collection of his work to take into deployment with them. Despite the poet's inquiries and the nature of the requests that prompted him to approach them, several publishers rejected The Wedge. Their grounds for doing so were a perceived lack of literary quality and wartime shortages. The book was eventually handset printed by Henry Duncan and Wightman Williams at Cummington Press and bound surreptitiously on the premises and at the expense of one of the publishers who had previously rejected it. The book is dedicated to poet Louis Zukofsky, who helped Williams revise and rearrange the poems for publication.

Williams placed into The Wedge many of the poems, written since the late 1930s, intended initially for his book-length poem Paterson. (According to editor Christopher MacGowan, the poem "Paterson: the Falls" in The Wedge lays out both the later poem's theme and its eventual format.) He wrote to poet and publisher James Laughlin in 1943, "Paterson is coming along—this book is a personal finger-practicing to assist me in that: but that isn't all it is." Williams' original concept for The Wedge was for it to contain several forms of writing. These would include improvisational works he wrote in the 1920s, prose and selections from his play Many Loves. Eventually, with Zukofsky's assistance, Williams narrowed the book's focus. He reduced the book's material, eliminated the prose selections but added an introduction based on an address he gave at the New York Public Library in October 1943. In the opening poems, Williams states what would become the working strategy for his long poem Paterson, which he began not long afterwards.

== Table of Contents ==
- "Author's Introduction"
- "A Sort of a Song"
- "Catastrophic Birth"
- "Paterson: the Falls"
- "The Dance (in Brueghel's great picture)"
- "Writer's Prologue to a Play in Verse"
- "Burning the Christmas Trees"
- "In Chains"
- "[In Sisterly Fashion]"
- "The World Narrowed to a Point"
- "The Observer"
- "A Flowing River"
- "The Hounded Lovers"
- "The Cure"
- "To All Gentleness"
- "Three Sonnets"
- "The Poem"
- "The Rose (The stillness of the rose)"
- "Rumba! Rumba!"
- "A Plea for Mercy"
- "Figueras Castle"
- "Eternity"
- "The Hard Listener"
- "The Controversy"
- "Perfection"
- "Three Purists"
- "A Vision of Labor: 1931"
- "The Last Turn"
- "[The End of the Parade]"
- "The A, B & C of It"
- "[The Thoughtful Lover]"
- "The Aftermath"
- "The Semblances"
- "The Storm"
- "The Forgotten City"
- "The Yellow Chimney"
- "The Bare Tree"
- "Raleigh Was Right"
- "The Monstrous Marriage"
- "[Sometimes It Turns Dry and the Leaves Fall Before They Are Beautiful]"
- "Sparrows Among Dry Leaves"
- "Prelude to Winter"
- "Silence"
- "Another Year"
- "The Clouds [first version]"
- "A Cold Front"
- "Against the Sky"
- "An Address"
- "The Gentle Negress (Wandering among the chimneys)"
- "To Ford Madox Ford in Heaven"

== Bibliography ==
- Williams, William Carlos, ed. Christopher MacGowan, The Collected Poems of William Carlos Williams, Volume II: 1939-1962 (New York: New Directions, 1988), ISBN 0-8112-1063-4
