= Cid Corman =

American poet and editor (1924–2004)

Cid (Sidney) Corman (June 29, 1924 – March 12, 2004) was an American poet, translator and editor, most notably of Origin, who was a key figure in the history of American poetry in the second half of the 20th century.

== Life ==
Corman was born in Boston's Roxbury neighborhood and grew up nearby in the Dorchester neighborhood. His parents were both from Ukraine. From an early age he was an avid reader and showed an aptitude for drawing and calligraphy. He attended Boston Latin School and in 1941 he entered Tufts University, where he achieved Phi Beta Kappa honours and wrote his first poems. He was excused from service in World War II for medical reasons and graduated in 1945.

Corman studied for his Master's degree at the University of Michigan, where he won the Hopwood poetry award, but dropped out two credits short of completion. After a brief stint at the University of North Carolina at Chapel Hill, he spent some time travelling around the United States, returning to Boston in 1948.

== Career ==
=== Early work ===
Corman's first book, Subluna, was privately printed in 1944. He ran poetry events in public libraries and, with the help of his high-school friend Nat Hentoff, he started the country's first poetry radio program.

In 1952, Corman wrote: "I initiated my weekly broadcasts, known as This Is Poetry, from WMEX (1510 kc.) in Boston. The program has been usually a fifteen-minute reading of modern verse on Saturday evenings at seven thirty; however, I have taken some liberties and have read from Moby Dick and from stories by Dylan Thomas, Robert Creeley, and Joyce."

This program featured readings by Robert Creeley, Stephen Spender, Theodore Roethke and many other Boston-based and visiting poets. He also spent some time at the Yaddo artists' retreat in Saratoga Springs. It was about this time that Corman changed his name from Sydney Corman to the simpler "Cid." As Corman indicated in conversation, this name change—similar to Walt Whitman's assumption of Walt over Walter—signaled his beginnings as a poet for the common man.

During this period, Corman was writing prolifically and published in excess of 500 poems in about 100 magazines by 1954. He considered this to be a kind of apprenticeship, and none of these poems were ever published in book form.

=== Origin and Europe ===
In 1951, Corman began Origin in response to the failure of a magazine that Creeley had planned. The magazine typically featured one writer per issue and ran, with breaks, until the mid-1980s. Poets featured included Robert Creeley, Robert Duncan, Larry Eigner, Denise Levertov, William Bronk, Theodore Enslin, Charles Olson, Louis Zukofsky, Clive Faust (Australian Poet), Gary Snyder, Lorine Niedecker, Wallace Stevens, William Carlos Williams, Paul Blackburn and Frank Samperi. The magazine also led to the establishment of Origin Press, which published books by a similar range of poets as well as by Corman himself and which remains currently active.

In 1954, Corman won a Fulbright Fellowship grant (with an endorsement from Marianne Moore) and moved to France, where he studied for a time at the Sorbonne. He then moved to Italy to teach English in a small town called Matera. By this time, Corman had published a number of small books, but his Italian experiences were to provide the materials for his first major work, Sun Rock Man (1962). He also experimented with oral poetry, recording improvised poems on tape. These tapes were later to influence the talk-poems of David Antin, one of the key developments in the emergence of performance poetry.

At this time he produced the first English translations of Paul Celan, even though he didn't have the poet's approval.

=== Japan ===
In 1958, Corman got a teaching job in Kyoto through the auspices of Will Petersen or, according to one account, poet Gary Snyder. Here he continued to write and to run Origin and in 1959 he published Snyder's first book, Riprap. He remained in Japan until 1960, when he returned to the States for two years. Back in Japan he married Konishi Shizumi, a Japanese TV news editor. Corman began to translate Japanese poetry, particularly work by Bashō and Kusano Shimpei.

The Cormans spent the years 1980 to 1982 in Boston, where they unsuccessfully tried to establish a number of small businesses. They returned to Kyoto, where they remained, running CC's Coffee Shop in Kyoto, "offering poetry and western-style patisserie".

=== Later work ===
Corman has been associated with the Beats, Black Mountain poets and Objectivists, mainly through his championing as an editor, publisher and critic. However, he remained independent of all groups and fashions throughout his career.

Michael Carlson, who contributed to Origin and corresponded with Corman starting in the 1980s, described Corman's correspondence this way: "In the days before email his words came by return post, aerogrammes densely typed to take advantage of every inch of space, or postcards printed in his fine hand. They were encouraging, gossipy, and always challenging; he expected everyone to match his commitment to poetry as a way of life. But they also digressed into other shared enthusiasms: in my case his love of baseball and sumo wrestling, and often into the difficulties of making a living in expensive Japan."

He was a prolific poet until his final illness, publishing more than 100 books and pamphlets. In 1990, he published the first two volumes of poems entitled, OF, running to some 1500 poems. These are mostly new works, not a selection of previously published poems. Volume 3, with a further 750 poems appeared in 1998. Volumes 4 and 5 were published as a single book in 2015 to complete the work. Several collections of wide-ranging essays have been published. His translations (or co-translations) include Bashō's Back Roads to Far Towns, Things by Francis Ponge, poems by Paul Celan and collections of haiku.

Cid Corman did not speak, read, or write Japanese, even though his co-translation with Susumu Kamaike of Bashō's Oku No Hosomichi (see above) is considered to be one of the most accurate in tone in the English language. Corman also felt himself able to translate from classical Chinese without so much as a minimal understanding of the language.

One of Corman's last appearances in the United States was at the 2003 centennial symposium and celebration in southern Wisconsin that honored his friend and fellow poet, Lorine Niedecker. At the time, Corman spoke warmly about his connection to the Fort Atkinson, Wisconsin poet (playing the only known audio tape of Niedecker reading from her works). Niedecker had died in 1970, shortly after Corman had visited her. As he told friends and admirers during the 2003 gathering, Corman had not returned to the Black Hawk Island haunts of Niedecker since that first (and only) visit with Niedecker.

He died in Kyoto, Japan on March 12, 2004, after being hospitalized for a cardiac condition since January 2004.
