= In Praise of Limestone =

Poem by W. H. Auden

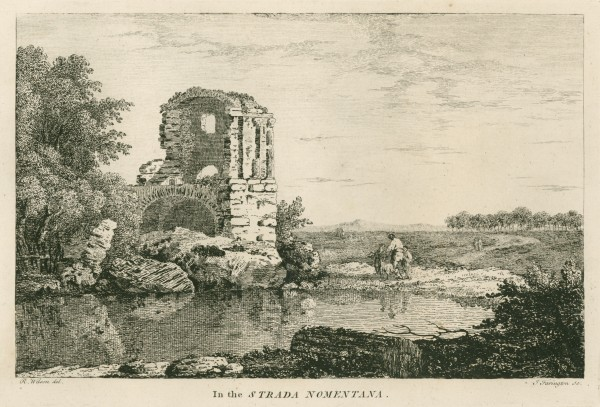
In the Strada Nomentana, Richard Wilson.

"In Praise of Limestone" is a poem written by W. H. Auden in Italy in May 1948. Central to his canon and one of Auden's finest poems, it has been the subject of diverse scholarly interpretations. Auden's limestone landscape has been interpreted as an allegory of Mediterranean civilization and of the human body. The poem is sui generis and not easily classified. As a topographical poem, it describes a landscape and infuses it with meaning. It has been called the "first … postmodern pastoral." In a letter, Auden wrote of limestone and the poem's theme that "that rock creates the only human landscape."

First published in Horizon in July 1948, the poem then appeared in his important 1951 collection Nones. A revised version was published beginning in 1958, and is prominently placed in the last chronological section of Auden's Collected Shorter Poems, 1922–1957 (1966).

== Themes ==
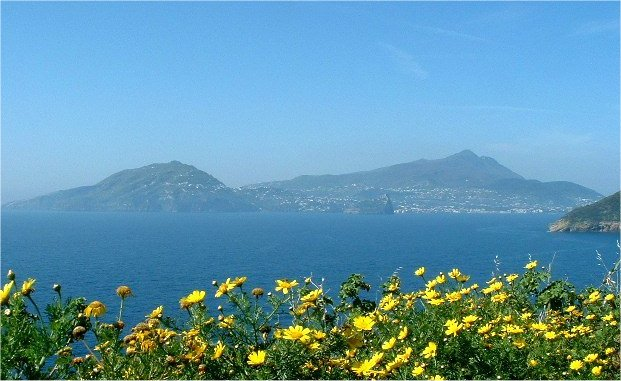
A view of Ischia, where Auden wrote "Limestone".

Auden visited Ischia, an island in the Gulf of Naples, with Chester Kallman, in spring and summer 1948, and spent about six weeks on Ischia; "In Praise of Limestone" was the first poem he wrote in Italy. The titular limestone is characteristic of the Mediterranean landscape and is considered an allegory of history in the poem; the properties of this sedimentary rock invoke the sedentary and domestic picture of Mediterranean culture. The calcium in limestone makes it water-soluble and easily eroded, yet limestone builds up over eons, a stratum at a time, out of organic matter, recalling the stratified history of Mediterranean civilisation. Interpreting the metaphor of ground in poetry, the critic Rainer Emig writes, "The ground [is] a perfect symbol of cultural, ethnic, and national identity, a significatory confluence of the historical and the mythical, individual and collective."

According to critic Alan W. France, the Mediterranean's religious tradition and culture are contrasted in "Limestone" with the Protestant and rationalistic "Gothic North". He views the poem as an attempt to "rediscover the sacramental quality of nature, a quality still animate in the 'under-developed' regions of the Mediterranean South—in particular Italy below Rome, the Mezzogiorno—but thoroughly extirpated in the Germanic North by Protestant asceticism and modern science." Auden, then, is looking on this landscape from the outside, as a member of the Northern community, yet includes himself as one of the "inconstant ones":

If it form the one landscape that we, the inconstant ones,
Are consistently homesick for, this is chiefly
Because it dissolves in water. […]

— Lines 1–3

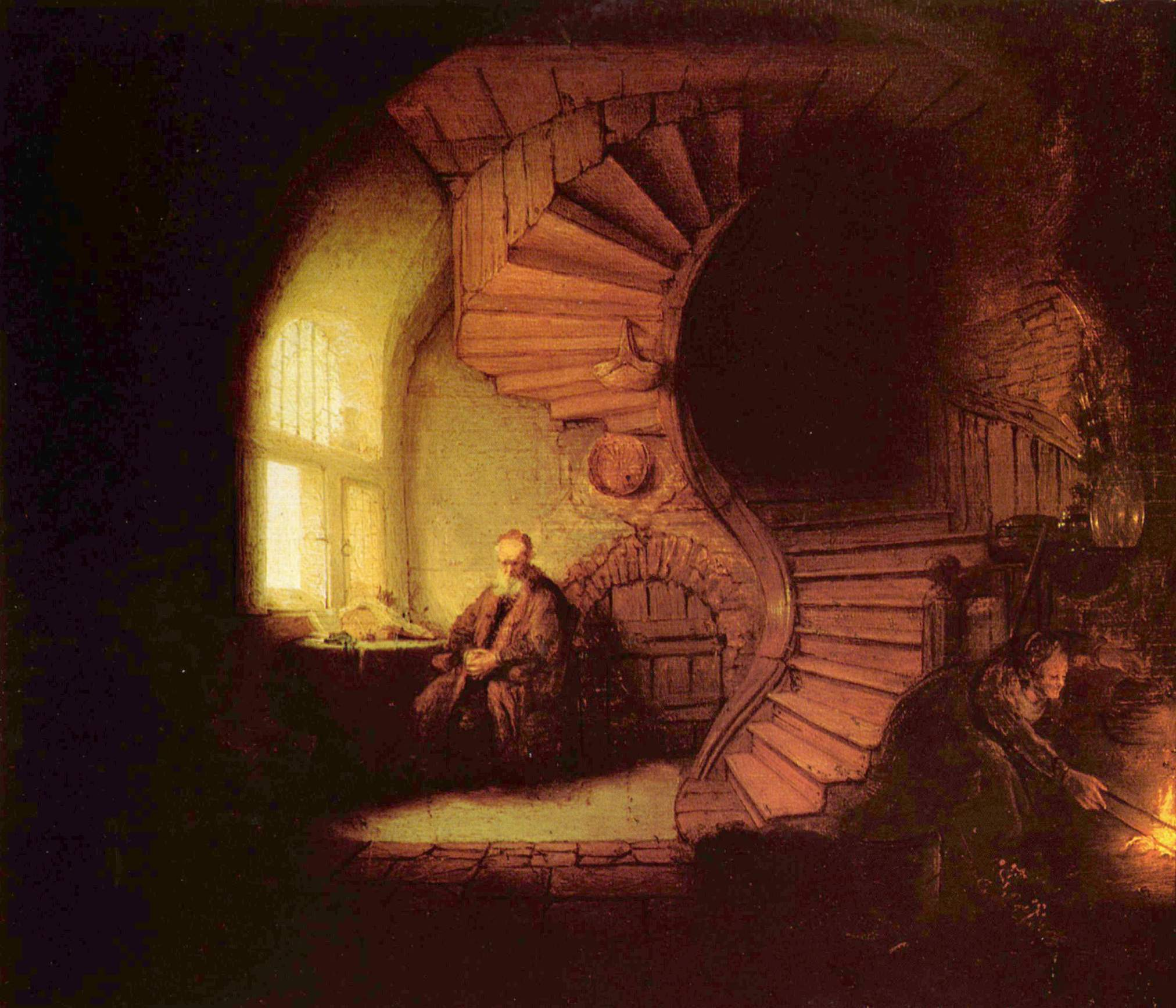
Rembrandt's Scholar in Meditation (1633) seeks an internal landscape.

Other outsiders, however—the constant and more single-minded (the "best and worst")—do not share his appreciation for the landscape. Rather, they "never stayed here long but sought/ Immoderate soils where the beauty was not so external". The "granite wastes" attracted the ascetic "saints-to-be", the "clays and gravels" tempted the would-be tyrants (who "left, slamming the door", an allusion to Goebbels' taunt that if the Nazis failed, they would "slam the door" with a bang that would shake the universe), and an "older colder voice, the oceanic whisper" beckoned the "really reckless" romantic solitaries who renounce or deny life:

'I am the solitude that asks and promises nothing;
That is how I shall set you free. There is no love;
There are only the various envies, all of them sad.'

— Lines 57–59

The immoderate soils together represent the danger of humans "trying to be little gods on earth", while the limestone landscape promises that life's pleasures need not be incompatible with public responsibility and salvation. After seeming to dismiss the landscape as historically insignificant in these middle sections of the poem, Auden justifies it in theological terms at the end. In a world where "sins can be forgiven" and "bodies rise from the dead", the limestone landscape makes "a further point:/ The blessed will not care what angle they are regarded from/ Having nothing to hide." The poem concludes by envisioning a realm like that of the Kingdom of God in physical, not idealistic terms:

[…] Dear, I know nothing of
Either, but when I try to imagine a faultless love
Or the life to come, what I hear is the murmur
Of underground streams, what I see is a limestone landscape.

— Lines 90–93

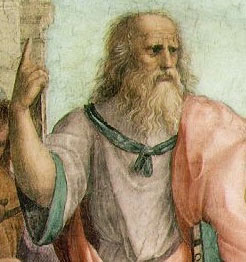
The limestone landscape rejects abstractions such as Platonic idealism—the notion that substantive reality is only a reflection of a higher truth.

Auden's literary executor and biographer Edward Mendelson and others interpret the poem as an allegory of the human body, whose characteristics correspond to those of the limestone landscape. The poet recognises that this landscape, like the body, is not witness to great historical events, but exists at a scale most suitable to humans. "Limestone" questions the valuation of that which exists on a scale different from the body—politics, the fascination with consciousness, and other abstractions. In this interpretation the poem's ending lines justify the landscape in theological terms, and are also a theological statement of the body's sacred significance. The poem is thus an argument against Platonic and idealistic theologies in which the body is inherently fallen and inferior to the spirit. This interpretation is consistent with Auden's many prose statements about the theological importance of the body.

The Karst topography of Auden's birthplace, Yorkshire, also contains limestone. Some readings of the poem have thus taken Auden to be describing his own homeland. Auden makes a connection between the two locales in a letter written from Italy in 1948 to Elizabeth Mayer: "I hadn't realized how like Italy is to my 'Mutterland,' the Pennines". The maternal theme in the poem—

What could be more like Mother or a fitter background
For her son, the flirtatious male who lounges
Against a rock in the sunlight, never doubting
That for all his faults he is loved; whose works are but
Extensions of his power to charm? […]

— Lines 11–15

—is a point of entry into the psychoanalytical interpretation of the poem, in which the limestone landscape is a suitable backdrop for narcissism. The poem's "band of rivals" cavorting about the "steep stone gennels" exists in an aesthetic and spiritual torpor—unable to "conceive a god whose temper-tantrums are moral/ And not to be pacified by a clever line/ Or a good lay…". Lacking inner conflict, these youth will never "separate" or produce a new kind of art. Compared to the trait's earlier literary treatments, "Limestone"'s narcissism "bodes not so much the promise of a powerful aesthetic, but an artistic culture which, while it seduces, is ultimately stultified by the gratification of its own desire".

== Structure and narration ==
The narrator's tone is informal and conversational, attempting to conjure the picture of a dialogue between the reader and the speaker (who is evidently Auden himself, speaking directly in the first person as he does in a large proportion of his work). The informality is established syntactically by enjambment—only 13 of the poem's 93 lines are clearly end-stopped. There are few instances of rhyme, and about half the lines end on unaccented syllables. The lines alternate 13 syllables incorporating five or six accents with 11 syllables and four accents. Auden adapted this syllabic construction from Marianne Moore. The pattern is reinforced by the line indentation and confirmed by Auden's own reading. This structure mitigates the tendency of normally accented English speech to fall into the rhythm of iambic pentameter. Swift changes in the sophistication of diction also occur in the poem, as in conversation, and lend it an immediate, informal quality.

The poet's audience seems to change between halves of the poem. He first addresses, in the first-person plural, an audience of like-minded readers or perhaps humans in general. He is discursive and speaks from a historical perspective, using imperatives such as "mark these rounded slopes", "hear the springs", and "examine this region". At line 44, his listener becomes a single beloved person, and the tone becomes more private. Auden now refers to himself, specifically, and addresses an intimate as "dear", with a greater sense of urgency:

They were right, my dear, all those voices were right
And still are; this land is not the sweet home that it looks,
Nor its peace the historical calm of a site
Where something was settled once and for all: A backward
And dilapidated province, connected
To the big busy world by a tunnel, with a certain
Seedy appeal, is that all it is now? Not quite:

— Lines 60-66

== Legacy ==
Mendelson, Auden's biographer, summarises the response to "In Praise of Limestone" in the years following its publication: "Readers found the poem memorable … but even the critics who praised it did not pretend to understand it. Those who, without quite knowing why, felt grateful to it were perhaps responding to its secret, unexplicit defense of a part of themselves that almost everything else written in their century was teaching them to discredit or deny."

The English poet Stephen Spender (1909–1995) called "In Praise of Limestone" one of the century's greatest poems, describing it as "the perfect fusion between Auden's personality and the power of acute moral observation of a more generalized psychological situation, which is his great gift". Literary critic David Daiches found it loose and unfulfilling. The poem became "In Praise of Sandstone" at the hand of Australian poet John Tranter (1943–2023), who created a poetic form called the "terminal" in which only the line-ending words of the source poem are kept in the writing of a new work.

== See also ==
- 1948 in poetry
