= Robert Creeley =

American poet (1926–2005)

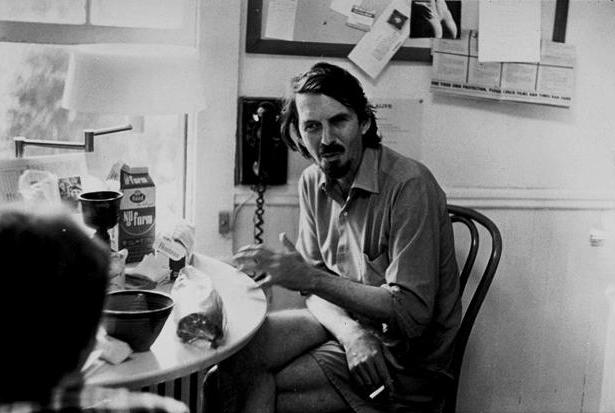
- Creeley in 1972
- Born: May 21, 1926; Arlington, Massachusetts, US
- Died: March 30, 2005 (aged 78); Odessa, Texas, US
- Education: Harvard University; Black Mountain College (BA)
- Writing career
- Genre: Poetry
- Notable work: For Love
- Notable awards: Bollingen Prize, 1999, Robert Frost Medal, 1987
- Movements: Modernism, Post-Modernism

Robert White Creeley (May 21, 1926 – March 30, 2005) was an American poet and author of more than 60 books. He is associated with the Black Mountain poets, although his verse aesthetic diverged from that school. Creeley was close with Charles Olson, Robert Duncan, Allen Ginsberg, John Wieners and Ed Dorn.

Creeley served as the Samuel P. Capen Professor of Poetry and the Humanities at State University of New York at Buffalo. In 1991, he joined colleagues Susan Howe, Charles Bernstein, Raymond Federman, Robert Bertholf, and Dennis Tedlock in founding the Poetics Program at Buffalo.

Creeley lived in Waldoboro, Buffalo, and Providence, where he taught at Brown University. He was a recipient of the Lannan Foundation Lifetime Achievement Award.

== Early life ==
Creeley was born in Arlington, Massachusetts, and grew up in Acton. He and his sister, Helen, were raised by their mother. At the age of two, he lost his left eye. He attended the Holderness School in New Hampshire. In 1943, he entered Harvard University, but left to serve in the American Field Service in Burma and India in 1944–1945. He returned to Harvard in 1946, but eventually earned his BA from Black Mountain College in 1955, teaching some courses there as well. After teaching in Albuquerque, New Mexico, Creeley visited San Francisco for two months in the spring of 1956, having heard from Kenneth Rexroth about a local poetic "renaissance" underway. There he met Allen Ginsberg, who had recently completed Howl, and befriended Jack Kerouac. Creeley later met and befriended Jackson Pollock at the Cedar Tavern in New York City.

In a quiet moment I hear Bob pause where I never would have expected it. Such resolve. Such heart. And an ear to reckon with. No truly further American poem without his.

— Clark Coolidge

He was a chicken farmer briefly in Littleton, New Hampshire, before becoming a teacher in 1949. The story goes that he wrote to Cid Corman, whose radio show he heard on the farm, and Corman had him read on the show, which is how Charles Olson first heard of Creeley.

== Work ==
From 1951 to 1955, Creeley and his wife, Ann, lived with their three children on the Spanish island of Mallorca. They went there at the encouragement of their friends, British writer Martin Seymour-Smith and his partner, Janet Seymour-Smith. There they started Divers Press and published works by Paul Blackburn, Robert Duncan, Charles Olson, and others. Creeley wrote about half of his published prose while living on the island, including a short-story collection, The Gold Diggers, and a novel, The Island. He said that Martin and Janet Seymour-Smith are represented by Artie and Marge in the novel. During 1954 and 1955, Creeley traveled back and forth between Mallorca and his teaching position at Black Mountain College. He also saw to the printing of some issues of Origin and Black Mountain Review on Mallorca, because the printing costs were significantly lower there.

In 1960, Creeley earned an MA from the University of New Mexico. He began his academic career by teaching at the prestigious Albuquerque Academy starting in 1958 until about 1960 or 1961. In 1957, he met Bobbie Louise Hawkins; they lived together in a common law marriage until 1975 and had two children, Sarah and Katherine. He dedicated his book For Love to Bobbie.

Creeley read at the 1963 Vancouver Poetry Festival, when he was teaching at the University of British Columbia for a short time, and at the 1965 Berkeley Poetry Conference. Afterward, he wandered about a bit before settling into the English faculty of "Black Mountain II" at the University at Buffalo in 1967. He would stay at this post until 2003, when he received a post at Brown University. From 1990 to 2003, he lived with his family in Black Rock neighborhood of Buffalo, New York, in a converted firehouse at the corner of Amherst and East Streets. At the time of his death, he was in residence with the Lannan Foundation in Marfa, Texas.

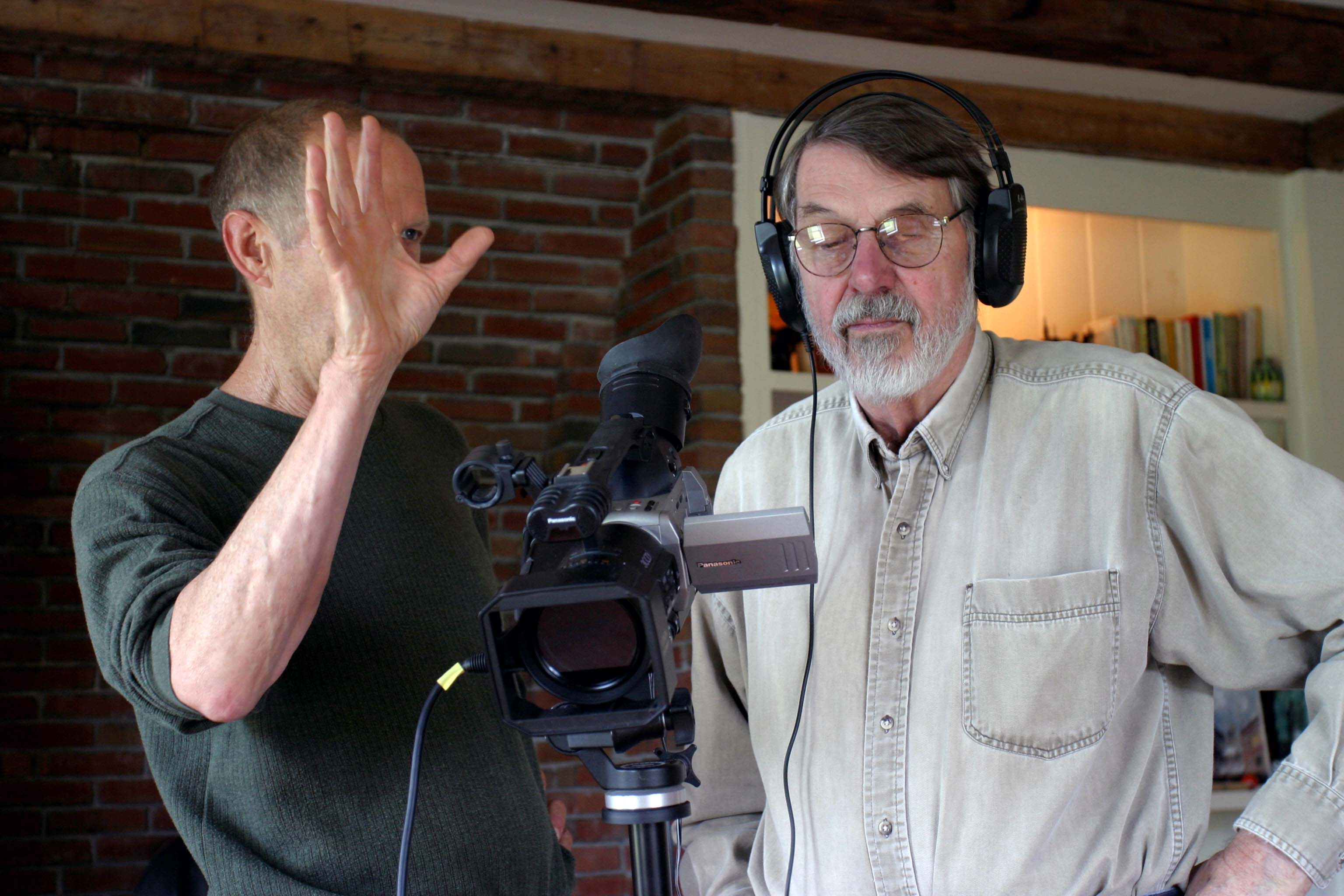
Robert Creeley and Allan Graham, during the taping of "Add-Verse", 2004, photo by Gloria Graham

Creeley first received fame in 1962 from his poetry collection For Love. He would go on to win the Bollingen Prize, among others, and to hold the position of New York State Poet laureate from 1989 until 1991. He was elected a Fellow of the American Academy of Arts and Sciences in 2003.

In 1968, he signed the "Writers and Editors War Tax Protest" pledge, vowing to refuse tax payments in protest against the Vietnam War.

In his later years he was an advocate of, and a mentor to, many younger poets, as well as to others outside of the poetry world. He went to great lengths to be supportive to many people regardless of any poetic affiliation. Being responsive appeared to be essential to his personal ethics, and he seemed to take this responsibility extremely seriously, in both his life and his craft. In his later years, when he became well-known, he would go to lengths to make strangers, who approached him as a well-known author, feel comfortable. In his last years, he used the Internet to keep in touch with many younger poets and friends.

== Death ==
Robert Creeley died in the morning of March 30, 2005, in Odessa, Texas of complications from pneumonia. He is buried in Cambridge, Massachusetts.

In 2016, a short documentary was made about Robert Creeley's son, Will Creeley, in which Will shared stories of his father's legacy and their relationship. The film was entitled For Will.

== Poetry ==
Arthur L. Ford in his book Robert Creeley (1978, p. 25) describes the poet,

Creeley has long been aware that he is part of a definable tradition in the American poetry of this century, so long as 'tradition' is thought of in general terms and so long as it recognizes crucial distinctions among its members. The tradition most visible to the general public has been the Eliot-Stevens tradition supported by the intellectual probings of the New Critics in the 1940s and early 1950s. Parallel to that tradition has been the tradition Creeley identifies with, the Pound-Olson-Zukofsky-Black Mountain tradition, what M. L. Rosenthal [in his 1967 book The New Poets: American and British Poetry Since World War II] calls 'The Projectivist Movement.' This "movement" Rosenthal derives from Olson's essay on "Projective Verse."

Le Fou, Creeley's first book, was published in 1952, and since then, according to his publisher, barely a year passed without a new collection of poems. The 1983 entry, titled Mirrors, had some tendencies toward concrete imagery. It was hard for many readers and critics to immediately understand Creeley's reputation as an innovative poet, for his innovations were often very subtle; even harder for some to imagine that his work lived up to the Black Mountain tenet – which he articulated to Charles Olson in their correspondence, and which Olson popularized in his essay "Projective Verse," – that "form is never more than an extension of content," for his poems were often written in couplet, triplet, and quatrain stanzas that break into and out of rhyme as happenstance appears to dictate. An example is "The Hero," from Collected Poems, also published in 1982 and covering the span of years from 1945 to 1975.

"The Hero" is written in variable isoverbal ("word-count") prosody; the number of words per line varies from three to seven, but the norm is four to six. Another technique to be found in this piece is variable rhyme – there is no set rhyme scheme, but some of the lines rhyme and the poem concludes with a rhymed couplet. All of the stanzas are quatrains, as in the first two:

Each voice which was asked
spoke its words, and heard
more than that, the fair question,
the onerous burden of the asking.

And so the hero, the
hero! stepped that gracefully
into his redemption, losing
or gaining life thereby.

— The Hero

Despite these obviously formal elements various critics continue to insist that Creeley wrote in "free verse", but most of his forms were strict enough so that it is a question whether it can even be maintained that he wrote in forms of prose. This particular poem is verse-mode, not prose-mode. M. L. Rosenthal in his book The New Poets quoted Creeley's "preoccupation with a personal rhythm in the sense that the discovery of an external equivalent of the speaking self is felt to be the true object of poetry," and went on to say that this speaking self serves both as the center of the poem's universe and the private life of the poet. "Despite his mask of humble, confused comedian, loving and lovable, he therefore stands in his own work's way, too seldom letting his poems free themselves of his blocking presence" (p. 148). When he used imagery, Creeley could be interesting and effective on the sensory level.

In an essay titled "Poetry: Schools of Dissidents," the academic poet Daniel Hoffman wrote, in The Harvard Guide to Contemporary American Writing, which he edited, that as he grew older, Creeley's work tended to become increasingly fragmentary in nature, even the titles subsequent to For Love: Poems 1950–1960 hinting at the fragmentation of experience in Creeley's work: Words, Pieces, A Day Book. In Hoffman's opinion, "Creeley has never included ideas, or commitments to social issues, in the repertoire of his work; his stripped-down poems have been, as it were, a proving of Pound's belief in 'technique as the test of a man's sincerity'" (p. 533).

In 1979, jazz bassist Steve Swallow released the album Home (ECM) featuring poems by Creeley set to music, and Creeley later collaborated with Swallow on three further albums, including So There (ECM, 2005).

Early work by Creeley appeared in the avant-garde literary magazine Nomad at the beginning of the 1960s. Posthumous publications of Creeley's work have included the second volume of his Collected Poems, which was published in 2006, and The Selected Letters of Robert Creeley edited by Rod Smith, Kaplan Harris and Peter Baker, published in 2014 by the University of California Press.

== Bibliography ==
- Le Fou (Columbus, Ohio: Golden Goose Press, 1952)
- The Immoral Proposition (Karlsruhe-Durlach/Baden, Germany: Jonathan Williams, 1953)
- The Kind of Act Of (Palma de Mallorca, Spain: Divers Press, 1953)
- The Gold Diggers (Palma de Mallorca, Spain: Divers Press, 1954). ISBN 0-7145-0256-1
- A Snarling Garland of Xmas Verses, anonymous (Palma de Mallorca, Spain: Divers Press, 1954)
- All That Is Lovely in Men (Asheville, N.C.: Jonathan Williams, 1955)
- If You (San Francisco: Porpoise Bookshop, 1956)
- The Whip (Worcester, England: Migrant Books, 1957; Highland, N.C.: Jonathan Williams, 1957)
- A Form of Women (New York: Jargon Books in association with Corinth Books, 1959; Fontwell, Arundel, Sussex, England: Centaur, 1960)
- For Love: Poems 1950–1960 (New York: Scribners, 1962) ISBN 0-684-71738-7
- The Island (New York: Scribners, 1963; London: John Calder, 1964)
- Words (Rochester, Mich.: Perishable Press, 1965; enlarged as Words New York: Scribners, 1967)
- The Gold Diggers and Other Stories (London: John Calder, 1965; New York: Scribners, 1965)
- Poems 1950–1965 (London: Calder and Boyars, 1966)
- The Charm: Early and Uncollected Poems (Mt. Horeb, Wisc.: Perishable Press, 1967)
- Robert Creeley Reads (London: Turret Books/Calder and Boyars, 1967)
- A Sight (London, Cape Goliard, 1967)
- Divisions and Other Early Poems (Mt. Horeb, Wisc.: Perishable Press, 1968)
- The Finger (Los Angeles: Black Sparrow Press, 1968).
- 5 Numbers (New York: Poets Press, 1968)
- Numbers (Stuttgart, Germany: Edition Domberger / Düsseldorf, Germany: Galerie Schmela, 1968)
- Pieces (Los Angeles: Black Sparrow Press, 1968; New York: Scribners, 1969)
- Mazatlan: Sea (San Francisco: Poets Press, 1969)
- The Finger: Poems 1966–1969 (London: Calder and Boyars, 1970)
- In London (Bolinas, Calif.: Angel Hair Books, 1970)
- A Quick Graph: Collected Notes and Essays, edited by Donald Allen (San Francisco: Four Seasons Foundation, 1970)
- 1234567890, illustrations by Arthur Okamura (Berkeley: Shambhala Publications; San Francisco: Mudra, 1971)
- St. Martin's (Los Angeles: Black Sparrow Press, 1971)
- A Day Book (Berlin: Graphis, 1972); expanded edition including "In London," (New York: Scribners, 1972)
- Listen (Los Angeles: Black Sparrow Press, 1972)
- A Sense of Measure (London: Calder and Boyars, 1972)
- The Class of '47, with Joe Brainard (New York: Bouwerie Editions, 1973)
- Contexts of Poetry: Interviews 1961–1971, edited by Donald Allen (Bolinas, Calif.: Four Seasons Foundation, 1973) reprinting with others the Unmuzzled OX interview by Michael Andre
- Sparrow 6: The Creative (Los Angeles: Black Sparrow Press, 1973)
- For my mother: Genevieve Jules Creeley, April 8, 1887 – October 7, 1972 (Rushden, England: Sceptre Press, 1973)
- His Idea (Toronto: Coach House Press, 1973)
- Sparrow 14: Inside Out (Los Angeles: Black Sparrow Press, 1973)
- Thirty Things (Los Angeles: Black Sparrow Press, 1974)
- Backwards (Knotting, England: Sceptre Press, 1975)
- The Door: Selected Poems (Düsseldorf/München, Germany: S Press, 1975)
- Away (Santa Barbara, Calif.: Black Sparrow Press, 1976)
- Hello (Christchurch, New Zealand: Hawk Press, 1976)
- Mabel, A Story: and Other Prose (London: Marion Boyars, 1976)
- Presences: A Text for Marisol (New York: Scribners, 1976).
- Selected Poems (New York: Scribners, 1976)
- Sparrow 40: Was That a Real Poem or Did You Just Make It Up Yourself (Santa Barbara, Calif.: Black Sparrow Press, 1976).
- Mabel: A Story (Paris: Editions de l'Atelier Crommelynck, 1977)*Myself (Knotting, Bedfordshire, England: Sceptre Press, 1977)
- Thanks (Old Deerfield, Mass.: The Deerfield Press; Dublin, Ireland: The Gallery Press, 1977)
- Hello: A Journal, February 29 – May 3, 1976 (New York: New Directions, 1978; London: Marion Boyars, 1978) ISBN 0-7145-2657-6
- Later: A Poem (West Branch, Iowa: Toothpaste Press, 1978) ISBN 0-8112-0736-6
- Desultory Days (Knotting, Bedfordshire, England: Sceptre Press, 1978)
- Was That a Real Poem and Other Essays, edited by Donald Allen with a chronology by Mary Novik (Bolinas, Calif.: Four Seasons Foundation, 1979)
- Later (New York: New Directions, 1979; London: Marion Boyars, 1980)
- Corn Close (Knotting, Bedfordshire, England: Sceptre Press, 1980)
- Mother's Voice (Santa Barbara. Calif.: Am Here Books/Immediate Editions, 1981).
- Olson, Charles; Creeley, Robert; Butterick, George F. (editor). Charles Olson and Robert Creeley: The Complete Correspondence. 10 vols. (Santa Barbara: Black Sparrow Press, 1980–1996)
- The Collected Poems of Robert Creeley, 1945–1975 (Berkeley: University of California Press, 1982).
- Echoes (West Branch, Iowa: Toothpaste Press, 1982)
- A Calendar 1984 (West Branch, Iowa: Toothpaste Press, 1983)
- Mirrors (New York: New Directions, 1983)
- The Collected Prose of Robert Creeley (New York and London: Marion Boyars, 1984; corrected edition, Berkeley: University of California Press, 1985); current edition, Normal: Dalkey Archive Press, 2001, ISBN 978-1-56478-303-5
- Memory Gardens (New York: New Directions, 1986)
- The Company (Providence: Burning Deck, 1988)
- Window (Buffalo: The Poetry/Rare Books Collection, university at Buffalo, 1988)
- 7 & 6 (Albuquerque: Hoshour Gallery, 1988)
- Dreams (New York: Periphery / Salient Seedling Press, 1989)
- It (Zürich, Switzerland: Bruno Bischofberger, 1989)
- Robert Creeley: a Selection, 1945–1987 (New York: Dia Art Foundation, 1989)
- Autobiography (Madras, India and New York: Hanuman, 1990)
- Have a Heart (Boise: Limberlost Press, 1990)
- Places (Buffalo: Shuffaloff Press, 1990)
- Windows (New York: New Directions, 1990) ISBN 0-8112-1123-1
- Gnomic Verses (La Laguna, Canary Islands: Zasterle Press, 1991)
- The Old Days (Tarzana, Calif.: Ambrosia Press, 1991)
- Selected Poems (Berkeley: University of California Press, 1991)
- Life & Death (New York: Gagosian Gallery, 1993)
- Echoes (New York: New Directions, 1994)
- Loops: Ten Poems (Kripplebush, NY: Nadja, 1995)
- So There: Poems 1976–83 (New York: New Directions, 1998)
- Life & Death (New York: New Directions, 1998)
- Daybook of a Virtual Poet (Spuyten Duyvil, 1999)
- Just in Time: Poems 1984–1994 (New York: New Directions, 2001)
- If I Were Writing This (New York: New Directions, 2003)
- On Earth: Last Poems and an Essay (Berkeley: University of California Press, 2006)
- Collected Poems of Robert Creeley 1975–2005, (Berkeley: University of California Press, 2006)
- Allen, Donald M. and Robert Creeley. New American Story (Grove Press, 2001) ISBN 0-394-17298-1
- Reznikoff, Charles and Robert Creeley. The Manner Music ISBN 0-87685-325-4
- Selected Poems, 1945–2005, edited by Benjamin Friedlander; (Berkeley: University of California Press, 2008)ISBN 0-520-25196-2

Spanish translations:

- En la tierra: últimos poemas y un ensayo (México: Textofilia Ediciones, 2008) ISBN 978-968-9459-02-6

== Film appearances ==
- Creeley (directed by Bruce Jackson and Diane Christian), 1988.
- Poetry in Motion (directed by Ron Mann), 1982.
- Black Mountain Blues (work-in-progress directed by Colin Still of Optic Nerve), 2017.
- "For Will" short (directed by Grayson Goga and Grace Stalley), 2016

== See also ==
- Robert Creeley Foundation

== Research resources ==
- Faas, Ekbert (1990) Irving Layton and Robert Creeley: The Complete Correspondence 1953-1978. McGill-Queen's University Press.
- Faas, Ekbert (2001) Robert Creeley: A Biography. McGill-Queen's University Press.
- Robert Creeley Papers, 1950–2005 (432 linear ft.) are housed in the Department of Special Collections and University Archives at Stanford University Libraries
- The Robert Creeley Papers at Washington University in St. Louis
- Records of Robert Creeley are held by Simon Fraser University's Special Collections and Rare Books
