= Gloria Graham =

American artist based in New Mexico (born 1940)

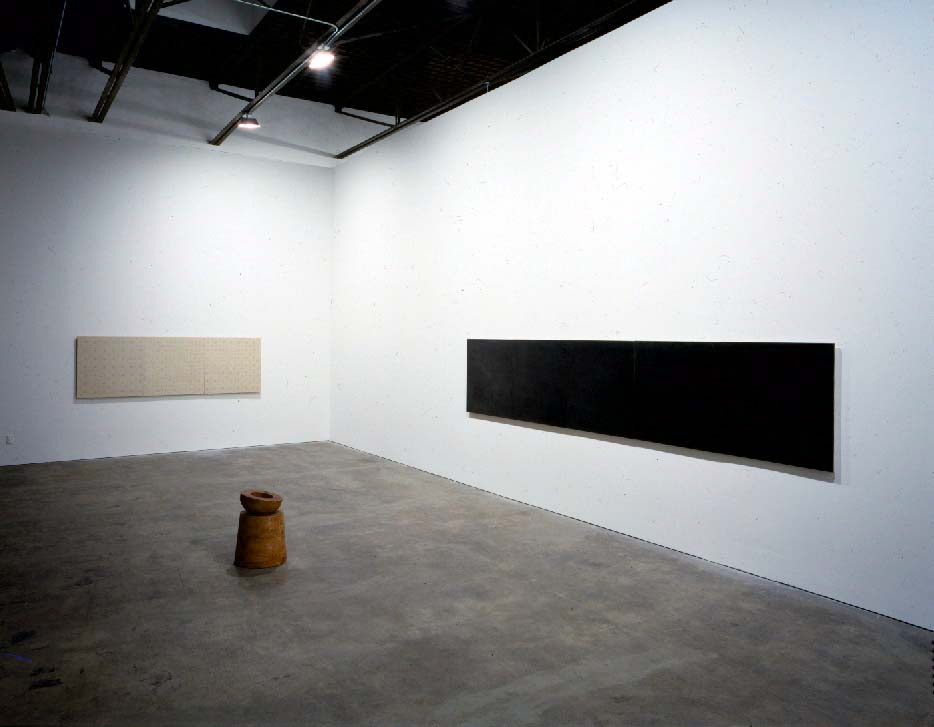
- Gloria Graham in 1995
- Born: 1940 (age 85–86); Beaumont, Texas
- Education: Baylor University; University of California, Berkeley; University of Wisconsin–Madison
- Known for: Sculpture, drawing, mixed media installations
- Awards: National Endowment for the Arts Fellowship
- Website: www.gloriagraham.info

Gloria Graham (born 1940) is an American artist based in New Mexico. Her work includes sculpture, painting, and photography.

== Background ==
Graham received a Bachelor of Fine Arts from Baylor University (1962) and attended the University of California, Berkeley (1962), as well as the University of Wisconsin–Madison. She then studied sculpture in Paris (1965). She began her artistic career in 1975 with a series of ceramic artifacts and later, in the mid-80s onward, creating works on canvas and wooden panels.

Her work is often based on science and geometric patterning, such as in a series of line drawings and paintings she did of the atomic structure of various crystals and minerals, which were inspired by the work of the physicist Max Von Laue.

Collector Panza di Biumo has written:

Gloria Graham's work is inspired to a spiritual research, that openly reveals itself in small-sized paintings.

She also has done large works of a similar nature by drawing the molecular structure of things such as salt and quartz on walls.

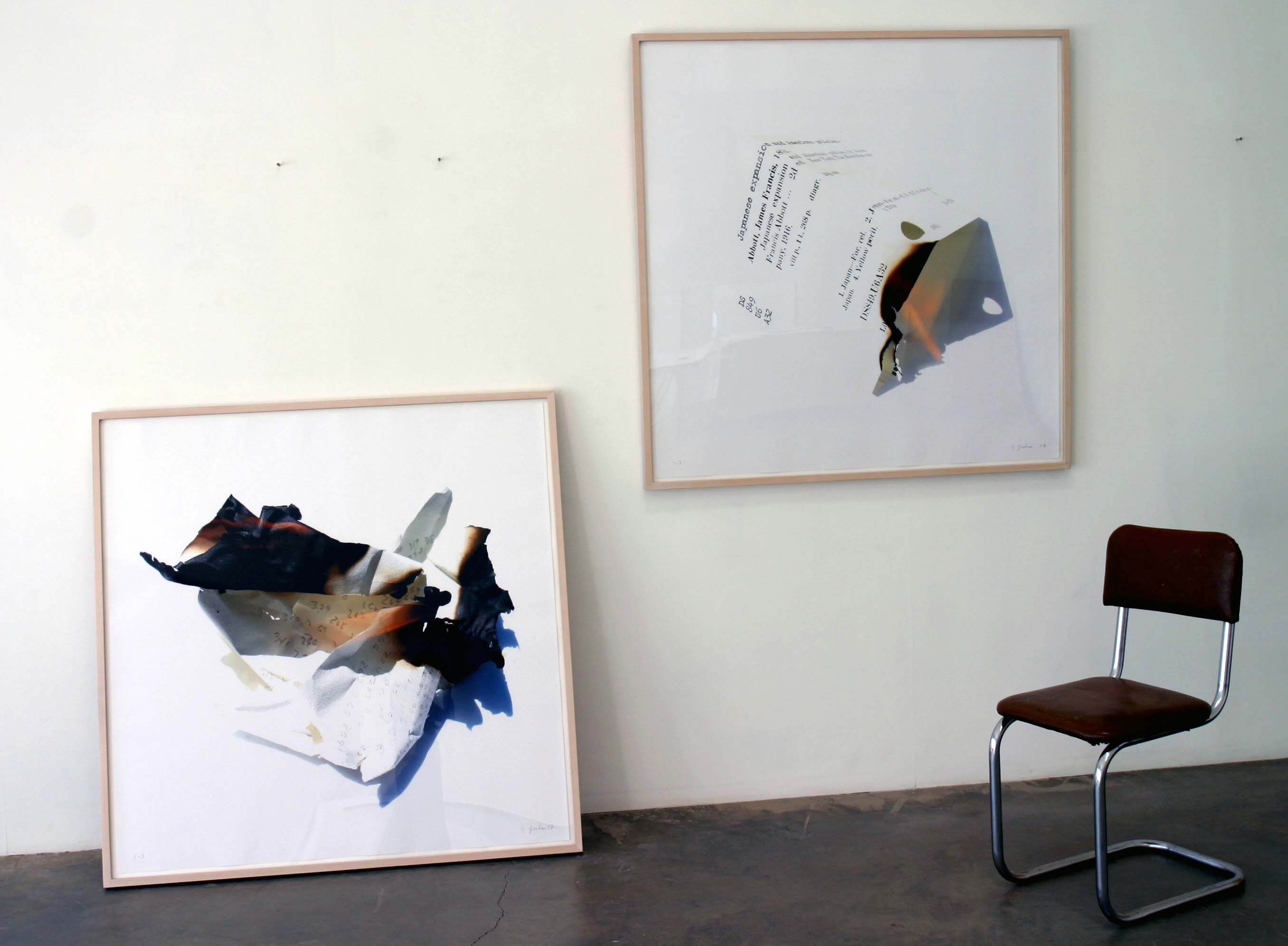
Graham's studio, 2009

More recently, she has become increasingly involved in photography, one of her pieces being an installation project which she did with the artist Allan Graham called "Add-Verse" in which she took photos of twenty-five poets and Allan Graham videotaped their hands/manuscripts, while they read their poetry.

== Materials ==
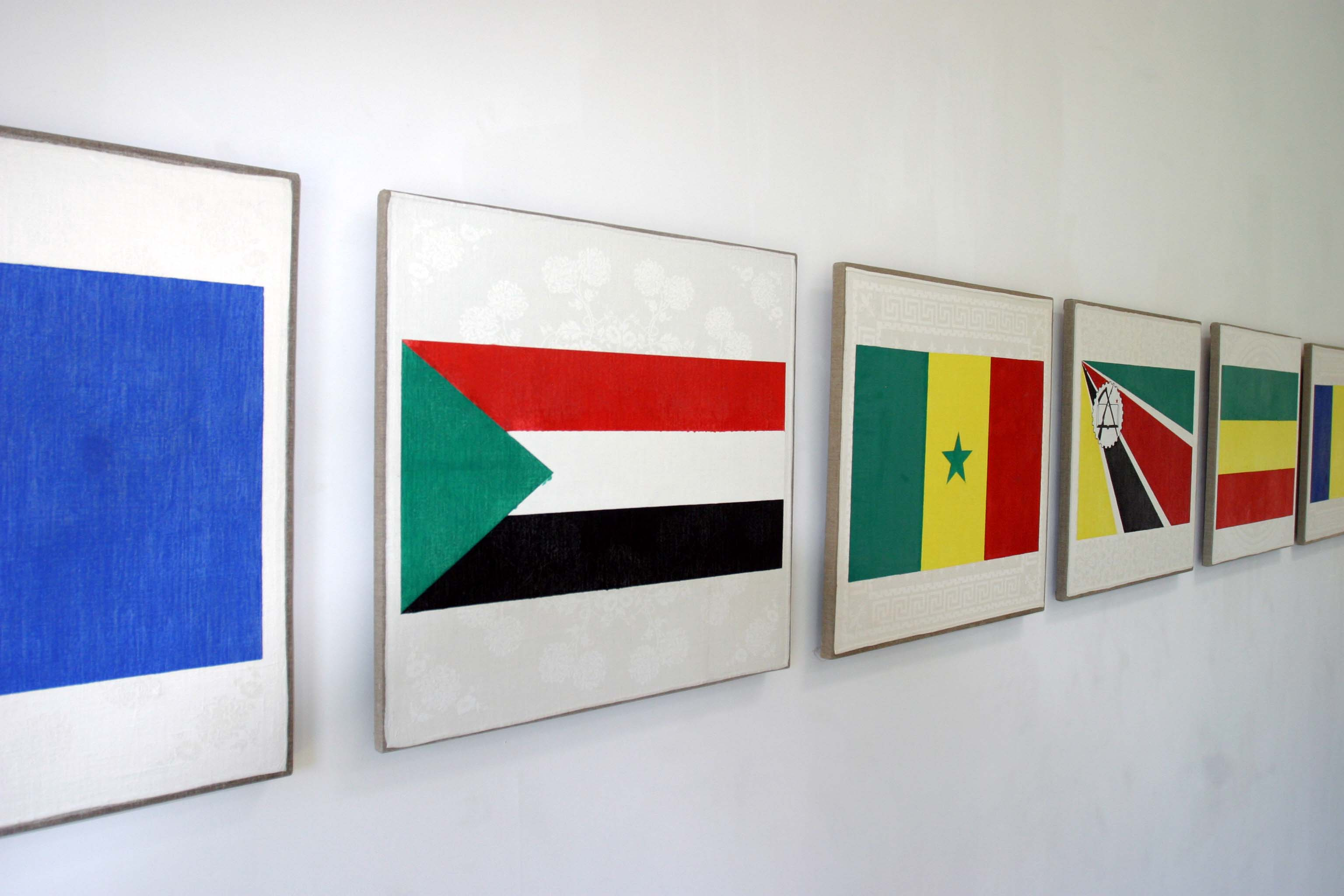
Gloria Graham, Famine Series (detail), 1988, oil on damask napkins over linen covered wooden panels

Though best known for her paintings, Graham has worked in other media. Her earlier work was mostly pottery: urns, cylindrical shapes and round objects.

In the mid-1980s she developed a technique of painting on wooden panels with a mixture of kaolin and hide glue, similar to the method used in the making of Tibetan tankas, which she then drew over with graphite. Graham has stated however that when she first began using kaolin, that she was unaware of the connection to Tibetan painting. Other materials she has used include aluminum, transparent paper, and graphite. In her Famine Series, the flags of eight African countries were painted on used damask napkins, a comment on our relationship to the fed and to the hungry.

== Public collections holding work ==
- Albright-Knox Art Gallery, Buffalo, NY
- The Broida Foundation
- Fisher Landau Center, Long Island City, New York
- Harwood Museum of Art, Taos, NM
- The Lannan Foundation
- Museo Cantonale d'Arte, Lugano, Switzerland
- Museo di arte moderna e contemporanea di Trento e Rovereto, Rovereto, Italy
- Museum of Albuquerque, Albuquerque, NM
- Museum of Fine Arts, Houston, TX
- Museum of Fine Arts, Santa Fe, NM
- North Dakota Museum of Art, Grand Forks, ND
- Roswell Museum and Art Center, Roswell, NM
- Whitney Museum of American Art, New York, NY

== Awards ==
- Asian Cultural Council Grant to Japan
- Site Santa Fe Award
