= Louis Zukofsky =

American poet (1904–1978)

- Born: January 23, 1904; New York City, United States
- Died: May 12, 1978 (aged 74); Port Jefferson, New York, United States
- Education: Columbia University (BA, MA)
- Occupations: Poet, professor

Louis Zukofsky (January 23, 1904 – May 12, 1978) was an American poet. He was the primary instigator and theorist of the so-called "Objectivist" poets, a short lived collective of poets who after several decades of obscurity would reemerge around 1960 and become a significant influence on subsequent generations of poets in America and abroad.

== Life ==
Louis Zukofsky was born in New York City's Lower East Side to Yiddish speaking immigrants from Lithuania, then part of the Russian Empire. His father Pinchos (ca. 1860–1950) immigrated to the United States in 1898, and was followed in 1903 by his wife, Chana (1862–1927), and their three children. Pinchos worked as a pants-presser and night watchman for many decades in New York's garment district.

The only one of his siblings born in the United States, Louis Zukofsky was a precocious student in the local public school system. As a boy he frequented the nearby Yiddish theatres on the Bowery, where he saw classic works by Shakespeare, Ibsen, Strindberg, and Tolstoy performed in Yiddish. Zukofsky began writing poetry at an early age, and his earliest known publications were in the student literary journal of Stuyvesant High School, from which he graduated at age 15. While when young he translated from the modern Yiddish poetry of Yehoash (Solomon Blumgarten), there is no indication he ever considered writing in Yiddish himself.

Beginning shortly before his 16th birthday in January 1920, Zukofsky attended Columbia University's undergraduate men's college and Graduate School of Arts and Sciences, where he studied English. Some of his teachers and classmates subsequently emerged as important lodestars of midcentury literature and culture, namely Mark Van Doren (who maintained a lifelong acquaintance with Zukofsky despite lambasting him as a "painfully inarticulate soul" in a 1927 article), John Dewey, John Erskine, Lionel Trilling and Mortimer Adler (who may have enjoined Zukofsky to study the humanities instead of engineering). He joined the Boar's Head Society and published in the Morningside, a student literary journal. Although he was elected to Phi Beta Kappa upon completing nearly all of the undergraduate curriculum in three and a half years, much like Adler, Zukofsky did not receive a Columbia College degree after dropping out of the required physical education course. Nevertheless, he was admitted to the Graduate School, receiving an M.A. in 1924 with a thesis on Henry Adams. He would publish a revised version of this thesis as "Henry Adams: A Criticism in Autobiography" in the journal Pagany, and Adams would remain a significant intellectual influence on Zukofsky's work. One of Zukofsky's closest friends during the 1920s was his Columbia classmate, Whittaker Chambers, and throughout the 1930s he aligned himself with Marxism, although he never joined the Communist Party. Despite his academic success, Zukofsky was not offered an instructorship that may have facilitated the completion of a Ph.D. or an eventual tenure-track academic appointment; according to a retrospective 2002 analysis by Mark Scroggins, "Then as now, writing one's thesis on a recently dead and as yet uncanonized figure (Adams had died only six years before) was not the path to academic preferment [...] [Zukofsky's inability to secure an instructorship] might have been a matter of personality: quiet and withdrawn, Zukofsky no doubt seemed less than promising teaching material. And the unwritten code of anti-Semitism that reigned in the English department--and that would not be broken until Lionel Trilling was hired in 1939--almost certainly told against him. At any rate, Zukofsky's formal schooling ended in 1924, and he would make no attempt to continue to the doctorate."

During the 1930-31 academic year, Zukofsky taught English at the University of Wisconsin–Madison, the only time he lived outside the New York City metropolitan area. In 1934, Zukofsky began work as a researcher with the Works Projects Administration (WPA), and over the course of the rest of the decade he worked on various WPA projects, most notably the Index of American Design, a history of American material culture. In the same year, he met Celia Thaew (1913–1980) and they married in 1939; their only child, Paul Zukofsky (1943–2017), was a child prodigy violinist and went on to become a prominent avant-garde violinist and conductor. During World War II, Zukofsky edited technical manuals at a number of electronics companies working in support of the war effort. In 1947, he took a job as an instructor in the English Department of the Polytechnic Institute of Brooklyn, where he would remain until his retirement at the rank of associate professor in 1965. He subsequently was a visiting professor at the University of Connecticut.

Throughout most of the 1940s and 1950s, the Zukofskys lived in Brooklyn Heights, then from 1964 to 1973 in Manhattan, and finally they retired to the Suffolk County outer suburb of Port Jefferson, New York, where he completed his magnum opus "A" and his last major work, the highly compressed poetic sequence 80 Flowers. Just a few months after completing the latter work and proof-reading the complete "A", Zukofsky died on May 12, 1978. He had been awarded National Endowment for the Arts Grants in 1967 and 1968, the National Institute of Arts and Letters "award for creative work in literature" in 1976, and an honorary doctorate from Bard College in 1977.

== Early career ==
As a student Zukofsky wrote prolifically in imitation of many styles, both traditional and free verse. However, his first distinctive work was the long poem, "Poem beginning 'The,'" composed in 1926 and published by Ezra Pound in his journal The Exile in 1928. Demonstrating a precocious assimilation of modernist styles, this is an autobiographical portrait of the young poet. The poem satirizes the older modernists for their pessimism, particularly T.S. Eliot's The Waste Land, examines his cultural identity and the question of assimilation as the son of immigrant Jews, and concludes by asserting his poetic independence from the claims of family and his Jewish heritage, opting instead for a more cosmopolitan poetic identity. Pound remained an important supporter of Zukofsky in the following years, famously dedicating Guide to Kulchur (1938) "To Louis Zukofsky and Basil Bunting strugglers in the desert." Their relationship over the course of the 1930s became severely strained because of Pound's increasingly strident fascism and anti-semitism, yet Zukofsky always maintained the highest regard for Pound's poetic abilities.

=== "Objectivist" Poets ===
Pound put Zukofsky in contact with William Carlos Williams, who would remain a major supporter of and influence on the younger poet. Williams found Zukofsky to be a valuable critic and editor of his own work, which he acknowledge by dedicating The Wedge (1944) to L.Z.. Pound persuaded the editor of Poetry magazine, Harriet Monroe, to allow Zukofsky to edit an issue showcasing younger poets, resulting in the famous "Objectivists" issue (Feb. 1931), which included Zukofsky's statement "Sincerity and Objectification." Although all the poets, including Zukofsky, denied any intention of forming a distinct poetic movement, a core group became identified as the Objectivist poets, which included besides Zukofsky, his friends Charles Reznikoff, George Oppen and Carl Rakosi, and Lorine Niedecker as well as Pound's friend and protégé Basil Bunting. Zukofsky edited An "Objectivists" Anthology (1932), published by George Oppen's To, Publishers, and for a brief spell there was the collective The Objectivist Press, but the group attracted only limited attention at the time.

=== "A" ===
Zukofsky's major work was the very long poem "A"—he never referred to it without the quotation marks—which he began in 1928 and would work on intermittently for most of the rest of his life, finally completing the poem in 1974. He predetermined that the work would have 24 sections, which he called movements, but both formally and thematically he allowed the poem to develop as the occasion dictated. "A"-1 opens at a performance of Bach's St. Matthew Passion, whose fugal intricacies became one of the formal models for the poem. The first six movements are predominately autobiographical but all directly or indirectly considering the question of the proper form for the poem at hand—"A"-6 ends by posing the question: "With all this material / To what distinction—." The preliminary answer is "A"-7, often taken to be Zukofsky's first distinctly individual poem that looks forward to much that will follow. This movement is a set of seven sonnets which focus on sawhorses marking off an area of a street under repair, which are imaginatively animated, a dynamic image of the poem itself as a construction site simultaneously constructed and deconstructed. In a number of later movements, Zukofsky would similarly adopt strict traditional forms combined with unconventional materials to create highly compacted poems: "A"-9 takes the intricate form of Guido Cavalcanti's canzone, "Donna me prega," using content mostly adapted from Karl Marx's Capital. A related major poem, although outside of "A", is "'Mantis'" which adopts the form of a sestina by Dante to create a political lyric, to which Zukofsky added "An Interpretation" reflecting on the question of poetic form relevant to contemporary concerns. In counterpoint to these highly formal and compacted movements, there are sprawling free-verse movements, notably "A"-8, whose depiction of contemporary world interviews vignettes of the Great Depression with the writings of Marx, Lenin and Henry Adams on American history. Much of Zukofsky's work of the 1930s attempted to bring together modernist formalism with a Leftist political perspective. "A"-10 is a cry of despair in response to the fall of France in June 1940 structured on Bach's Mass in B minor, after which Zukofsky paused work on "A" for some years.

=== Other early writings ===
In tandem with "A", Zukofsky continued writing shorter poems throughout his life, although he had difficulties publishing outside of journals during the Depression era. His first collection of shorter poems, 55 Poems, did not appear until 1941, although it represented work completed by the mid-1930, including "Poem beginning 'The'" and "'Mantis.'" Another collection, Anew, came out in 1946. In the mid-1930s he also wrote his only play, Arise, Arise, a political dream play, which however remained unperformed and unpublished until the 1960s. During the same period he wrote a work of experimental prose, Thanks to the Dictionary, improvising with the vocabulary and definitions found in the dictionary. In the early 1940s he attempted more conventional short stories, of which the novella length Ferdinand is the most significant. One of Zukofsky's most eccentric works was Le Style Apollinaire/The Writing of Guillaume Apollinaire (1934), which was ghost written for his friend René Taupin, presenting three approaches to the body of Apollinaire's work in large part through the presentation and arrangement of quotations. Throughout much of the 1930s Zukofsky worked on a poetry textbook, A Test of Poetry, after the manner of Pound's ABC of Reading, primarily juxtaposing sample poems or excerpts with little commentary and asking to student to draw their own conclusions. Although initially this text only saw the light of day when self-published in 1948, it has since been reprinted three times.

== Later career ==
In 1948, Zukofsky returned to "A" after a hiatus of eight years with the second half of "A"-9, which again copies the complex form of Cavalcanti's canzone, but now using content primarily derived from Spinoza's Ethics. The distinct concerns of the two-halves of "A"-9 mark a decisive shift of emphasis from the political and social to the more personal and philosophical, but without repudiating the earlier focus. Avoiding pre-determined narratives or themes, Zukofsky always intended that "A"'s development would be determined by historical and personal changes over the time of the poem's composition. This was affirmed with "A"-11, which mimics the form of a ballata by Cavalcanti but directly addresses his wife and son on the topic of mortality. From this point the poet's immediate family will usually play a major role while the poem becomes more expansive in its concerns. This movement was shortly followed up with "A"-12, a sprawling 135-page collage interweaving the personal, current events and philosophy, primarily represented by Aristotle, Paracelsus and Spinoza. However, at the time there was little chance that he could publish a work on this scale, and "A"-12 did not appear complete until the first book publication of "A" 1–12 in 1959. Much of the 1950s was preoccupied with another very large-scale work, Bottom: on Shakespeare, which began as an essay growing out of a summer course on Renaissance literature he taught at Hamilton College in 1947 but grew into a massive critical meditation on Shakespeare, arguing for the priority of the sensuous eye over the abstract mind. This work was as much a statement on poetics as a exegesis of Shakespeare presented in the unorthodox critical manner Zukofsky preferred, marshalling and collaging large numbers of quotations from numerous texts. When finally published in 1964, Bottom was accompanied by a companion volume consisting of Celia Zukofsky's musical setting of Shakespeare's play Pericles, Prince of Tyre.

Since the 1930s, Zukofsky worked in obscurity and found it difficult to publish, but gradually from the mid-1950s younger poets, most notably Robert Duncan and Robert Creeley, began to seek him out because of their desire to reconnect with the more innovative strands of poetic modernism developing from Pound and Williams. The poets and editors Cid Corman and Jonathan Williams published major works in the late 1950s, especially the first book publication of "A" by Corman's Origin Press. Along with the other Objectivists, from around 1960 Zukofsky was in considerable demand among these younger poets, and consequently was able to publish numerous volumes over the last decade and half of his life, a period when he wrote prolifically and inventively.

With the completion of Bottom, Zukofsky returned to "A" with "A"-13, a "partita" in five sub-sections using a range of different forms. The late, mostly long, movements of "A" are characterized by the adoption of a diversity of flexible forms capable of absorbing great variation of materials, from the conversational, to newspapers and media, to book reading, and the treatment of these materials ranges from quotation to radical reduction to creative transmutation, including homophonic transcription. A sense of the everyday is interwoven with contemporary events, with "A"-15 responding to the assassination of President Kennedy and "A"-18 darkened by the trauma of the Vietnam War. In contrast to the usually long movements, "A"-16 is just four words scattered across a single page, while "A"-17 is a homage to William Carlos Williams on his death in 1963 in the form of a catalogue of quotations recording the two poets' friendship. "A"-21 is a complete and quirky translation of Plautus' play Rudens (The Rope) interspersed with additional "Voice offs" of Zukofsky's invention. In 1968, Celia Zukofsky presented her husband with an elaborate musical assemblage: against the musical score of Handel's "Hapsichord Pieces" she arranged four voices consisting entirely of quotations from across Zukofsky's writings, suggesting one possible version of a single total work. Zukofsky promptly decided this would be the final movement of "A", although he still had two further movement to write. "A"-22 & -23 were conceived on an epic scale: each 1,000 lines, with an 800-line main body framed by 100-line segments, the main bodies each compressed radically reworked materials from history and literature respectively spanning 6,000 years in chronological order. In this late work the soundscape tends to predominate over thematic or narrative orders, or as he once put it, "not to fathom time but literally to sound it as on an instrument."

Another major work that preoccupied Zukofsky for much of the 1960s was the controversial Catullus, a homophonic translation from Latin done in collaboration with his wife of the entire existent works of Catullus. Although it outraged many when first published, this has been one of the most discussed and debated of Zukofsky's works. He also finished a novel begun in the early 1950s, Little, an autobiographical account centered on a child violin prodigy, based on his son Paul. Aside from "A", several collections of mostly short poems were published in the late 1950s and early 1960s, and particularly notable is the long poem "4 Other Countries" included in Barely and widely (1958), a travelogue of the Zukofskys' 1957 trip to Europe, written in a more relaxed and accessible manner than is typical of his poetry. As his reputation rose, Zukofsky collected short poetry in two volumes (1965, 1966) was published by Norton, his first books with a commercial publisher. Soon after his collected critical essay were gathered into Prepositions (1968). On finally completing "A" in 1974, Zukofsky promptly started on his last major work, 80 Flowers, a sequence of eighty-one short poems (eight lines of five words each), highly compressed reworkings of botanical and literary materials. Although planned for completion for his 80th birthday, he as usual worked ahead of schedule and finished the sequence in January 1978, already planning a follow-up sequence on trees to be entitled Gamut: 90 trees. However, he had only composed the epigraph to this latter work when he died in May 1978.

== Legacy ==
Although Zukofsky and the Objectivists would have little impact in the 1930s, their later rediscovery around 1960 would have a major influence on a broad range of younger poets known as the New American Poets. This was particularly the case because most of the Objectivists produced their most mature and innovative work during the 1960s and 1970s, which in many respects represented a salutatory formal emphasis that contrasted with the looseness of most Beat and projectivist verse. Aside from Duncan and Creeley, among the many American poets who have acknowledged the influence of Zukofsky in their work include Theodore Enslin, Ronald Johnson, John Taggart and Michael Palmer. In the 1970s, Zukofsky's formalism was a major model for many of the Language poets, and the prominent Language writer, Charles Bernstein, edited a volume of selected poems for the Library of America (2006).

During his lifetime, Zukofsky had some contact and interaction with Augusto de Campos and the Brazilian Concrete poetry movement. French poets in particular have been attracted to Zukofsky's example. Anne-Marie Albiach composed an intricate and much admired translation of "A"-9 in 1970, which helped bring Zukofsky to French attention. Other French poets engaged in translating Zukofsky include Jacques Roubaud and Pierre Alféri. A complete French translation of "A" (except for "A"-24) by François Dominique and Serge Gavronsky came out to considerable acclaim in 2020.

== Bibliography ==
=== Poetry, prose, drama ===
- An "Objectivists" Anthology, ed. Louis Zukofsky (To, Publishers, 1932)
- Le Style Apollinaire, with René Taupin (Les Presses Modernes, 1934), criticism
- First Half of "A" 9 (privately printed, 1940)
- 55 Poems (Decker Press, 1941)
- Anew (Decker Press,1946)
- A Test of Poetry (Objectivist Press, 1948), textbook
- Some Time (Jargon, 1956)
- 5 Statements for Poetry (San Francisco State College, 1958), essays
- Barely and widely (Celia Zukofsky, 1958)
- "A" 1–12 (Origin Press, 1959)
- It Was (Origin Press, 1961), short fiction
- Bottom: on Shakespeare, 2 volumes (Volume 2 is Celia Zukofsky's musical setting of Shakespeare's play Pericles) (1963)
- I's (pronounced eyes) (Trobar Press, 1963)
- After I's (Boxwood/Mother Press, 1964)
- All: The Collected Short Poems, 1923–1958 (Norton, 1965)
- All: The Collected Short Poems, 1956–1964 (Norton, 1966)
- Prepositions: The Collected Critical Essays of Louis Zukofsky (Rapp & Whitting/Horizon, 1968)
- "A" 13–21 (Jonathan Cape/Doubleday, 1969)
- Catullus, with Celia Zukofsky (Cape Goliard/Grossman, 1969)
- Autobiography (Grossman, 1970), selection of poems set to music by Celia Zukofsky
- Little: for Careenagers (Grossman, 1970), novel
- "A" 24 (Grossman, 1972)
- Arise, Arise (Grossman, 1973), play (composed mid-1930s)
- "A" 22 & 23 (Grossman, 1975)
- 80 Flowers (Celia Zukofsky, 1978)
- "A" (University of California Press, 1978), complete edition

=== Letters and Collected editions ===
- "A" (University of California Press, 1978; reprinted Johns Hopkins University Press, 1993; New Directions, 2011)
- Pound/Zukofsky: Selected Letters of Ezra Pound and Louis Zukofsky, ed. Barry Ahearn (Faber & Faber, 1987)
- Collected Fiction (Dalkey Archive, 1990)
- Complete Short Poetry (Johns Hopkins University Press, 1991; reprinted as Anew: Complete Short Poetry, New Directions, 2011)
- Niedecker and the Correspondence with Zukofsky 1931–1970, ed. Jenny Penberthy (Cambridge University Press, 1993), does not include Zukofsky's side of the correspondence
- The Correspondence of William Carlos Williams & Louis Zukofsky, ed. Barry Ahearn (Wesleyan University Press, 2003
- The Selected Letters of Louis Zukofsky, ed. Barry Ahearn (2013). Revised and enlarged, eds. Barry Ahearn with Jeffrey Twitchell-Waas (Z-site Publications, 2026).
- The Uncollected Louis Zukofsky: Poetry, Drama, Prose, eds. Jeffrey Twitchell-Waas & Mark Scroggins (University of New Mexico Press, 2026)

=== Centennial Edition of the Complete Critical Writings ===
- A Test of Poetry. Foreword by Robert Creeley (Wesleyan University Press, 2000)
- Prepositions+: The Collected Critical Essays. Foreword by Charles Bernstein; Additional Prose edited & introduced by Mark Scroggins (Wesleyan University Press, 2001)
- Bottom: on Shakespeare, with Celia Thaew Zukofsky. Foreword by Bob Perelman (Wesleyan University Press, 2003)
- A Useful Art: Essays and Radio Scripts on American Design. Edited with an introduction by Kenneth Sherwood; afterword by John Taggart (Wesleyan University Press, 2003)
- The Writing of Guillaume Apollinaire/Le Style Apollinaire. Bilingual edition edited with introduction by Serge Gavronsky; foreword by Jean Daive (Wesleyan University Press, 2004)

The primary repository of Louis Zukofsky's manuscripts, notebooks and papers is the Harry Ransom Research Center at the University of Texas at Austin.
