= University of Connecticut Archives and Special Collections =

Research library in Storrs, Connecticut

Coordinates: 41.805944°N 72.250500°W

Archives and Special Collections, UConn Library

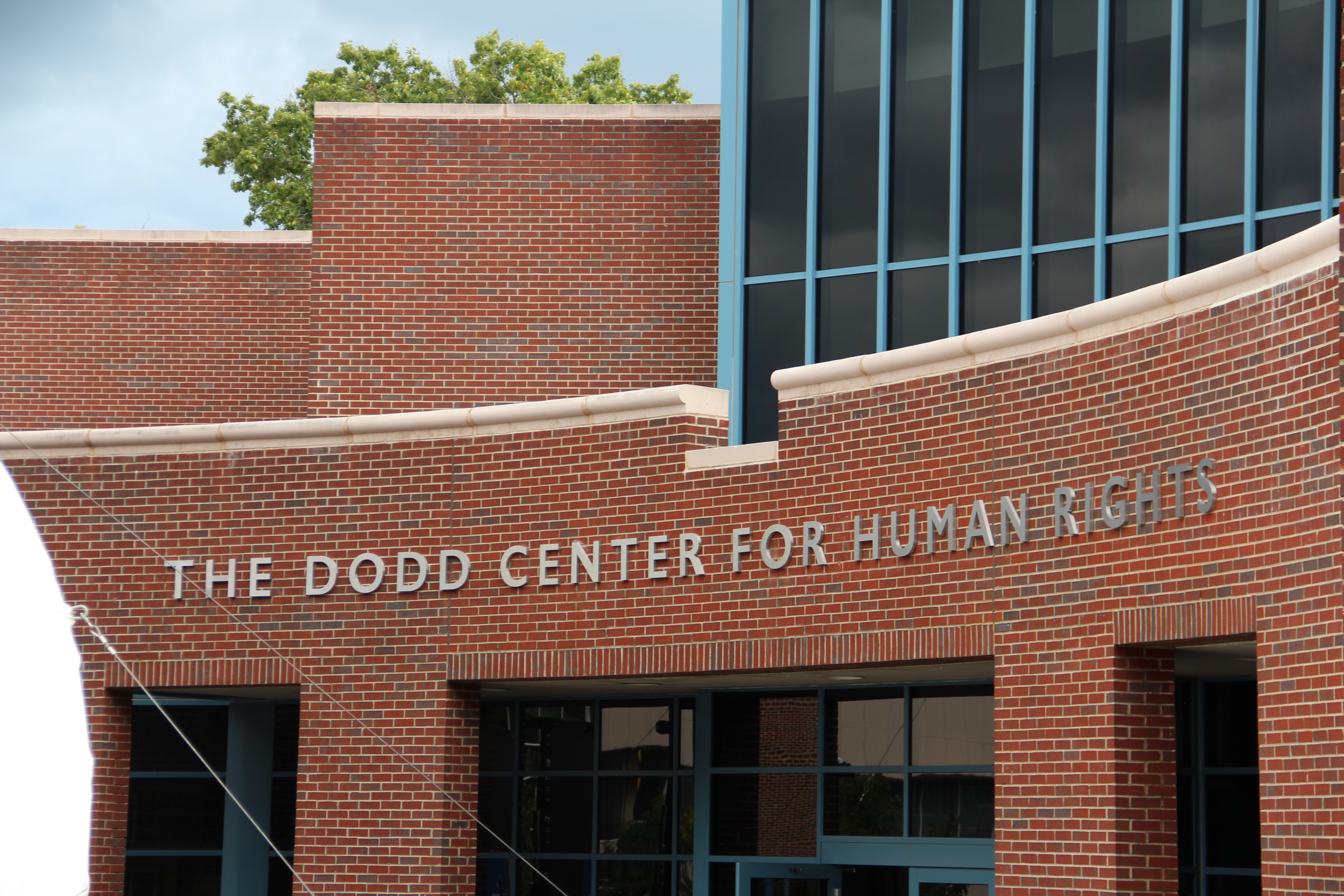
- Location: Storrs, Connecticut, United States
- Type: Archives & special collections library
- Branch of: University of Connecticut Libraries

Access and use
- Access requirements: Open to the public

Other information
- Website: https://lib.uconn.edu/location/asc/

The University of Connecticut Archives and Special Collections is part of University of Connecticut Libraries and provides research support to the university and wider public by collecting, stewarding, and providing access to historical, literary, and artistic materials of enduring value.

Archives and Special Collections is open to the public and free to all.

== Collections and Collecting Areas ==
Meaningful collecting areas and notable collections include:

=== The alternative press ===
The collection consists of newspapers, periodicals and pamphlets of the non-establishment or alternative movements, political, economic and social, of the twentieth century, primarily American. Begun in 1967 when ephemeral campus underground materials were collected by Special Collections Department staff, documentation continued through the 1970s to focus on political and social problems of the decade In addition to subject files on alternative organizations, posters, buttons, and ephemera from social movements in the United States, the APC contains manuscript collections, including the personal papers of activists such as Abbie Hoffman, Cal Robertson, Stephen Thornton, and Foster Gunnison; records of social justice organizations such as the Connecticut Civil Liberties Union; and various topical collections including the Poras Collection of Vietnam War Memorabilia and the Meyer Collection of Fat Liberation

=== Children's authors and artists ===
Comprising over 120 archives of notable authors and illustrators of children’s literature native to or identified with the Northeast and East Coast of the United States, the Northeast Children’s Literature Collection (NCLC) has as its purpose to preserve the history of the creation of our best literature written for children. Emphasis is given to the perception of children’s literature as a form of art over other educational or social intentions. Archives are collected to document the process of children’s book creation by authors and illustrators in collaboration with agents, editors, designers and publishers. Creators include Richard Scarry, Marc Simont, James Marshall, Ruth Krauss, Arnold Lobel, Ed Young, Tomie dePaola, Leonard Weisgard, Esphyr Slobodkina, Joanna Cole, Grace Lin, Natalie Babbitt, Barbara Cooney, Mary Ann Hoberman, Norman H. Finkelstein, Jean Marzollo, Barry Moser, Robert Andrew Parker, Candice F. Ransom, Cyndy Szekeres, and Rosemary Wells.

=== Connecticut business ===
The Connecticut business collections document Connecticut’s evolution from an agrarian society to one that played a vital role in the Industrial Revolution. The archives comprise daybooks from grist mills, dairy farms, and quarries of the early 19th century to annual reports and stock statements of companies whose dealings extended internationally in the mid and late 20th century. The majority of the archives are of businesses that made Connecticut an industry leader in the 19th and early 20th century/ Products include textiles and silk, brass and hardware manufacturing, clocks and watches, heavy machinery and tools, and telecommunications, with some collections in the areas of banking, rubber manufacturing, knitting needles, surgical sutures, toiletries and thermoses.

=== Connecticut labor history ===
The labor history collections document the activities of workers and labor unions in Connecticut in the twentieth century. The collecting area holds collections of mainly three distinct groups: the personal papers of labor activists, most of whom were active in the mid-20th century, including Dominic Badolatot, Henry Becker, Roger Borrup; labor unions affiliated with the AFL-CIO of workers at the state’s Pratt & Whitney or Hamilton Sunstrand plants; and labor councils, particularly the State Labor Council and the Greater Hartford Labor Council. Other collections include the records of the university’s Labor Education Center and two AFSCME related groups. The focus is almost solely on workers and labor unions in Connecticut in the 20th century.

=== Connecticut politics and public affairs ===
Records of delegates from Connecticut to the United States Congress from 1933 to the present including Thomas J. Dodd, Sam Gejdenson, Joseph D. Duffey, Nancy L. Johnson, John G. Rowland, Prescott S. Bush, William R. Cotter, Barbara B. Kennelly, Francis T. Maloney, Stewart B. McKinney, William R. Ratchford, Robert N. Giaimo, Abraham Ribicoff, Robert R. Simmons, Christopher Shays, Bernard F. Grabowski, and Bruce A. Morrison. In support of these materials, there are additional collections from select individuals and organizations involved in political/civic issues at the state level such as Bob Englehart, Vivien Kellems, Herman Wolf and the Caucus of Connecticut Democrats.

=== Fine press books and artists' books ===
Holdings include a wide variety of materials that reflect the evolution and innovation of the book as a creative medium. Among its holdings are fine press editions, limited-run publications, distinctive signed and designer bindings, artists’ books, and notable association copies. Since the late 1970s, the department has actively acquired experimental and artists’ books with the aim of supporting pedagogical and scholarly engagement, particularly for students in the fine and graphic arts.

A wide range of physical structures and fabrication techniques is represented. Works in multiple languages by both national and international artists contribute to the collection’s global scope. In addition to primary works, the collection includes reference literature and exhibition catalogs that provide contextual grounding and critical insight into the field of book arts.

=== Human rights ===
The Human Rights Collections include the Thomas J. Dodd Papers, which document his work as Chief Trial Counsel at the Nuremberg Trials, oral histories and documentation gathered in partnership with the African National Congress in South Africa, the records and library of Human Rights Internet, the records of the Coalition for International Justice, and the Refugee Case Files of the International Rescue Committee. Photographic collections, such as the Impact Visuals Photograph Collection, and the Romano Human Rights Digital Photograph Collection. Among the holdings are transcripts of interviews conducted by the Center for Oral History at the University of Connecticut.

=== Literary collections ===
The Literary Collections comprise the personal papers and manuscripts of over one hundred American and English writers. The bulk of the literary collections include the extensive personal papers of poet, literary theorist, and essayist Charles Olson, and extensive holdings of papers of poets associated with the Black Mountain, Beat, and New York Schools of poetry. Records of a number of small literary presses, as well as strong holdings of first editions, broadsides, fine and private press editions, artists’ books, and literary magazines, complement the manuscripts and document the networks of editors and contributors of which the writers were a part. Among the Literary Collections are the papers of several twentieth-century nature writers, including the Pulitzer Prize-winning author Edwin Way Teale, Phyllis Busch, George Heinold, and John K. Terres.

=== Nursing history ===
The collection provides context and support to the materials found in the University of Connecticut School of Nursing Archives. This area is particularly strong in its documentation of the professional development, status, and legal activities associated with nursing by the organizations in Connecticut on behalf of their members as well as 20th century nurse training. There is limited, but significant, documentation of information on 19th century nursing activities during the American Civil War in the Josephine Dolan Collection. Formats include manuscripts, diaries, correspondence, photographs, ephemera, sound recordings, and moving images.

=== Railroad history ===
The railroad history collecting area consists of papers, records and collections of a variety of archival materials related to southern New England’s railroad heritage, dating from the 1830s and the birth of railroad transportation in the United States to the 1980s. The materials are particularly strong in representing the New York, New Haven & Hartford Railroad, better known as the New Haven Railroad, which was the predominant railroad in the region from 1872 to 1969. Coverage is strong for the New Haven Railroad’s predecessor lines, particularly the Central New England Railway, the New York & New England Railroad, and the Old Colony Railroad.

=== Survey research ===
The collection was developed as a collaborative project of the Roper Center for Public Opinion Research and Archives & Special Collections at the Thomas J. Dodd Research Center (1997-2015). The goal of the project was to assemble, preserve and provide access to the professional and personal papers of the founders of the modern public opinion survey profession. Holdings include the papers of Elmo Roper, Samuel Lubell, Warren Mitofsky, Archibald Crossley and James Vicary, among others. The collections contain correspondence, survey instruments and reports, speeches and presentations on the topics of politics, race, consumer products and religion and conducted from the late 1920s through 2006.

=== University of Connecticut history ===
The University Archives holds the institutional memory of the University of Connecticut and is the largest and most comprehensive source of information on the history and cultural heritage of UConn and its predecessor institutions. As the collective memory of the university, the Archives contains official and historical records including documentation of governance, policy, operation of administrative offices, research, programs, and publications. Unpublished materials in the Archives include photographs, films, memorabilia, administrative records of major university offices, and the papers of presidents, administrative officers, and members of the faculty. Special collections have also been established to document such important events as UCONN 2000 and the men’s and women’s national basketball championships.

== History and founding ==
Planning for the Thomas J. Dodd Research Center was led by Norman Stevens. The groundbreaking ceremonies took place on Sunday, October 10, 1993. Its dedication was on October 15, 1995, and was performed by United States President Bill Clinton.

=== Partnership with African National Congress ===
UConn and the African National Congress (ANC) signed an agreement on March 1, 1999 establishing UConn as the official repository for copies of ANC materials in North America. The partnership included archiving materials that document the struggle against apartheid, conducting oral histories, faculty exchanges with the University of Fort Hare, and producing a biannual comparative human rights journal.

=== Connecticut Children's Book Fair ===
The Dodd Center and UConn Co-op collaborated to produce the Connecticut Children's Book Fair from 1991-2019.

=== Re-dedication of the Dodd Center ===
In 2021, the building was re-dedicated as the Dodd Center for Human Rights. United States President Joe Biden performed the rededication.
