= Nones (Auden) =

1951 poetry collection by W. H. Auden

- First UK edition
- Author: W. H. Auden
- Language: English
- Publication date: 1951

Nones is a book of poems by W. H. Auden published in 1951 by Faber & Faber. The book contains Auden's shorter poems written between 1946 and 1950, including "In Praise of Limestone", "Prime", "Nones," "Memorial for the City", "Precious Five", and "A Walk After Dark".

"Nones" is a contemporary setting of the Good Friday Passion.

The book includes "Barcarolle" (barcarolle), a poem from Auden's libretto for Igor Stravinsky's The Rake's Progress, the only poem in the book that did not appear in Auden's later collections. The book is dedicated to Protestant theologian Reinhold Niebuhr and his wife Ursula.

Composer Luciano Berio named his orchestral piece Nones, originally planned as an oratorio, after Auden's poem.
