= Shinpei =

- Gender: Male

Origin
- Origin: Japanese
- Meaning: Different meanings depending on the kanji used

Shinpei or Shimpei (written: 心平, 晋平, 新平, 伸平, 進平, 慎平 or 真平) is a masculine Japanese given name. Notable people with the name include:

- Etō Shimpei (江藤 新平; 1834–1874), Japanese politician
- Shinpei Fukuda (福田 真平; born 1987), Japanese cyclist
- Shimpei Fukuoka (福岡 慎平; born 2000), Japanese footballer
- Gotō Shinpei (後藤 新平; 1857–1929), Japanese politician
- Shimpei Itoh (伊藤 伸平; born 1960), Japanese manga artist
- Shinpei Matsushita (松下 新平; born 1966), Japanese politician
- Shinpei Mykawa (前川 真平; 1874–1906), Japanese farmer
- Shinpei Nakayama (中山 晋平; 1887–1952), Japanese songwriter
- Shinpei Ogura (小倉 進平; 1882–1944), Japanese linguist
- Shimpei Ota (太田 心平; born 1975), Japanese anthropologist
- Shimpei Sakurada (樱田 真平; born 1984), Japanese footballer
- Shinpei Takagi (actor, born 1902) (高木新平), Japanese actor
- Shinpei Takagi (actor, born 1985) (高木 心平), Japanese actor
- Shimpei Takeda, Japanese photographer
