= Theodore Enslin =

American poet

Theodore Vernon Enslin (March 25, 1925 – November 21, 2011) was an American poet associated with Cid Corman's Origin and press. He is widely regarded as one of the most musical of American avant-garde poets.

Enslin was born in Chester, Pennsylvania. His father was a biblical scholar and his mother a Latin scholar. He studied musical composition at Cambridge, Massachusetts. His teacher, Nadia Boulanger, was the first person to recognize his ability as a writer and encouraged him to pursue his interest in poetry. He has said "I like to be considered as a composer who happens to use words instead of notes." His first book, The Work Proposed, was published by Origin in 1958.

Enslin moved to Maine in 1960 and had lived in Washington County ever since, working at odd jobs and making and selling handmade walking sticks. The Maine landscape forms an integral part of his poetry, as does its isolation, both geographic and in terms of distance from literary fashion and the academy, on the physical margin of the United States. Ranger (1978) is one of the key American long poems of the second half of the 20th century. A bibliographical checklist of Enslin's works was prepared by Robert J. Bertholf and published in 2017.

He died in Milbridge, Maine on November 21, 2011.

== Publications ==
- The Work Proposed (1958)
- The Place Where I Am Standing: Poems (1964)
- This Do (1966)
- To Come, To Have Become: Poems 1961-66 (1966)
- New Sharon's Prospect & Journals (1966/1967)
- The Four Temperaments (1966)
- Characters in Certain Places (1967)
- The Diabelli Variations, and Other Poems (1967)
- Agreement and Back: Sequences (1969)
- Forms 1-5 (1970–1974)
- Views 1-7 Berkeley, CA: Maya (1970
- The Country of Our Consciousness (1971)
- Etudes (1972)
- Sitio (1973)
- The Swamp Fox (1973)
- Views (1973)
- With Light Reflected: Poems 1970-1972 (1973)
- The Mornings (1974)
- Fever Poems (1974)
- Of East Dennis: The Highlands in Sorrow (exact year not known: 197-?)
- Mahler (1975)
- Ländler (1975)
- The Median Flow: Poems 1943-1973 (1975)
- Synthesis 1-24 (1975)
- The July Book (1976)
- The Further Regions (1976)
- Carmina (1976)
- Papers (1976)
- Assensions (1977)
- Ranger CXXII & CXXVIII (1977)
- Circles (1977)
- Concentrations (1977)
- Ranger (2 vols. 1978 corrected edition 1980)
- Tailings (1978)
- Occurrence: An Issue of Theodore Enslin (1978)
- 16 Blossoms in February (1978)
- May Fault (1979)
- Opus 31, no. 3 (1979)
- 2 Plus 12 (1979)
- The Fifth Direction (1980)
- The Flare of Beginning Is in November (1980)
- Star Anise (1980)
- Two Geese: Two Poems (1980)
- Madrigal (ca. 1980)
- In Duo Concertante (1981)
- Axes 52 (1981)
- Markings (1981)
- Processionals (1981)
- September’s Bonfire (1981)
- “F. P.” (1982)
- Meditations on Varied Grounds (1982)
- A Man in Stir (1983)
- Gray Days (1984)
- Songs w/out Words (1984)
- The Weather Within (1985)
- For Mr. Walters: Master Mechanic (1985)
- Music For Several Occasions (1985)
- The Path Between (1986)
- The Waking of the Eye (1986)
- Case Book (1987)
- Six Pavannes (1987)
- Love and Science (1990)
- Little Wandering Flake of Snow (1991)
- Mad Songs (1995)
- Conversations (1998)
- Sequentiae (1999)
- Then and Now: Selected Poems, 1943-1993 (1999)
- The Roads Around Jenkins (2000)
- In Tandem (2003)
- Nine (2004)

== Archival Collection ==
The Theordore Enslin Papers are housed in the Fales Library at New York University.
