= 1960 in poetry =

Nationality words link to articles with information on the nation's poetry or literature (for instance, Irish or France).

== Events ==
- Spring – August Derleth launches the poetry magazine Hawk and Whippoorwill in the United States.
- September 5 – Welsh poet Waldo Williams is imprisoned for six weeks for non-payment of income tax (a protest against defence spending).
- An inscription of an excerpt of the Poema de Fernán González is discovered on a roofing tile in Merindad de Sotoscueva, the earliest known record of it.

== Works published in English ==
Listed by nation where the work was first published and again by the poet's native land, if different; substantially revised works listed separately:

=== Australia ===
- Colin Thiele, Man in a Landscape
- Roland Robinson, "Mapooram"

=== Canada ===
- Margaret Avison, Winter Sun
- Daryl Hine, The Devil's Picture Book
- Kenneth McRobbie, Eyes Without a Face
- Eli Mandel, Fuseli Poems
- Peter Miller, Sonata for Frog and Man

==== Anthologies ====
- Edmund Snow Carpenter, American anthropologist, editor, Anerca, anonymous Eskimo poems, with drawings by Enooesweetok
- A. J. M. Smith, editor, The Oxford book of Canadian verse, in English and French, including untranslated poems in French combined in chronological order with English-language poems

=== India, in English ===
- Nissim Ezekiel, The Unfinished Man: Poems Written in 1959, Calcutta: Writers Workshop, India
- Dom Moraes, John Nobody, Indian at this time living in the United Kingdom
- Deb Kumar Das, The Night before Us, Calcutta: Writers Workshop, India
- Pradip Sen, And Then the Sun, first edition (revised edition, 1968), Calcutta: Writers Workshop, India
- Raul De Loyola Furtado, The Oleanders and Other Poems, Calcutta: Writers Workshop, India
- Keshav Malik, The Rippled Shadow
- Barjor Paymaster, the Last Farewell and Other Poems, Bombay: Asia Publishing House
- V. Madhusudan Reddy, Sapphires of Solitude, Hyderabad: V. Man Mohan Reddy
- Sasthi Brata, Eleven Poems, Calcutta: published by the author

=== United Kingdom ===
- W. H. Auden, Homage to Clio
- Sir John Betjeman, Summoned by Bells
- Edwin Bronk, A Family Affair, Northwood, Middlesex: Scorpion Press
- Austin Clarke, The Hore-Eaters (see also Ancient Lights 1955, Too Great a Vine 1957)
- Patric Dickinson, The World I See
- Lawrence Durrell, Collected Poems
- D. J. Enright, Some Men Are Brothers
- Ted Hughes, Lupercal, London: Faber and Faber; New York: Harper
- John Knight, Straight Lines and Unicorns
- Peter Levi, The Gravel Ponds
- Patrick Kavanagh, Come Dance with Kitty Stobling
- Norman MacCaig, A Common Grace
- Dom Moraes, Poems, Indian at this time living in the United Kingdom
- Edwin Muir, Collected Poems (posthumous)
- Sylvia Plath, The Colossus and Other Poems, American at this time living in the United Kingdom
- William Plomer, Collected Poems
- Peter Redgrove, The Collector, and Other Poems, London: Routledge and Kegan Paul
- James Reeves, Collected Poems 1929–59
- Charles Tomlinson, Seeing is Believing
- Andrew Young, Collected Poems

=== United States ===
- John Ashbery, The Poems
- W. H. Auden, Homage to Clio
- Paul Blackburn, Brooklyn Manhattan Transit: A Bouquet for Flatbush
- Gwendolyn Brooks, The Bean Eaters, including "We Real Cool"
- Witter Bynner, New Poems
- Gregory Corso, The Happy Birthday of Death
- Louis Coxe, The Middle Passage
- E. E. Cummings, Collected Poems
- James Dickey, Into the Stone
- Robert Duncan:
  - The Opening of the Field
  - Selected Poems, San Francisco: City Lights Books
- Richard Eberhart, Collected Poems 1930–1960
- Paul Engle, Poems in Praise, including the sonnet sequence "For the Iowa Dead"
- Jean Garrigue, A Water Walk by Villa d'Este
- Ramon Guthrie, Graffiti
- Anthony Hecht, A Bestiary
- Daryl Hine, The Devil's Picture Book
- Daniel G. Hoffman, A Little Geste and Other Poems
- Randall Jarrell, The Woman at the Washington Zoo, New York: Atheneum
- LeRoi Jones, Preface to a Twenty Volume Suicide Note, New York: Totem/Corinth Books
- Donald Justice, The Summer Anniversaries
- Weldon Kees, The Collected Poems of Weldon Kees posthumous, edited by Donald Justice
- Jack Kerouac, Mexico City Blues
- Galway Kinnell, What a Kingdom It Was, Boston: Houghton Mifflin
- Denise Levertov, With Eyes at the Back of Our Heads
- Robert Lowell, Life Studies, New York: Farrar, Straus & Cudahy
- Phyllis McGinley, Times Three: Selected Verse from Three Decades
- James Merrill, Water Street, Atheneum Publishers
- W. S. Merwin:
  - The Drunk in the Furnace, New York: Macmillan (reprinted as part of The First Four Books of Poems, 1975)
  - Translator, The Satires of Persius, Bloomington, Indiana: Indiana University Press
- Joesphine Miles, Poems 1930–1960
- Howard Moss, A Winter Come, a Summer Gone: Poems 1946-1960, New York: Scribner's
- Howard Nemerov, New and Selected Poems, University of Chicago Press
- John Frederick Nims, Knowledge of the Evening
- Charles Olson:
  - The Distances, New York: Grove Press
  - The Maximus Poems, New York: Jargon/Corinth Books
- Kenneth Patchen, Because It Is
- Ezra Pound, Thrones: 96-109 de los Cantares, multi-lingual cantos
- Carl Sandburg, Wind Song
- Anne Sexton, To Bedlam and Part Way Back, Boston: Houghton Mifflin
- Wilfred Townley Scott, Scrimshaw
- W. D. Snodgrass, Heart's Needle
- Gary Snyder, Myths and Texts
- William Stafford, West of Your City
- Eleanor Ross Taylor, Wilderness of Ladies
- Theodore Weiss, Outlanders, New York: Macmillan
- Reed Whittemore, The Self-Made Man and Other Poems
- Yvor Winters, Collected Poems, Chicago: The Swallow Press

==== Criticism, scholarship and biography ====
- Cleanth Brooks and Robert Penn Warren, Understanding Poetry (college textbook), originally published in 1938, goes into its third edition (a fourth will be published in 1976)
- Ed Dorn, What I See in the Maximum Poems, Migrant Press (criticism)
- Karl Shapiro, In Defense of Ignorance, an attack on the dominant critical values of modern poetry in the vein of T. S. Eliot, W. B. Yeats and Ezra Pound

==== The New American Poetry 1945-1960 ====
The New American Poetry 1945-1960, a poetry anthology edited by Donald Allen, and published in 1960, aimed to pick out the "third generation" of American modernist poets. In the longer term it attained a classic status, with critical approval and continuing sales. It was reprinted in 1999.

Poets represented:

Helen Adam – John Ashbery – Paul Blackburn – Robin Blaser – Ebbe Borregaard – Bruce Boyd – Ray Bremser – Brother Antoninus – James Broughton – Paul Carroll – Gregory Corso – Robert Creeley – Edward Dorn – Kirby Doyle – Robert Duerden – Robert Duncan – Larry Eigner – Lawrence Ferlinghetti – Edward Field – Allen Ginsberg – Madeline Gleason – Barbara Guest – LeRoi Jones – Jack Kerouac – Kenneth Koch – Philip Lamantia – Denise Levertov – Ron Loewinsohn – Edward Marshall – Michael McClure – David Meltzer – Frank O'Hara – Charles Olson – Joel Oppenheimer – Peter Orlovsky – Stuart Perkoff – James Schuyler – Gary Snyder – Gilbert Sorrentino – Jack Spicer – Lew Welch – Philip Whalen – John Wieners – Jonathan Williams

=== Other in English ===
- Allen Curnow, The Penguin Book of New Zealand Verse, New Zealand

== Works in other languages ==
Listed by nation where the work was first published and again by the poet's native land, if different; substantially revised works listed separately:

=== French language ===
==== Canada, in French ====
- Anne Hébert, Poèmes
- Michèle Lalonde:
  - Songe de la fiancée détruite
  - Geôles
- Paul Morin, Géronte et son mirior
- Jean-Guy Pilon, La mouette et le large, Montréal: l'Hexagone
- Yves Préfontaine, L'Antre du poème
- Pierre Trottier, Les Belles au bois dormant
- Gilles Vigneault, Etraves

===== Criticism, scholarship and biography =====
- Gérard Bessette, Les Images en poésie canadienne-française

==== France ====
- Louis Aragon, Les Poetes
- Aimé Césaire, Ferrements, Martinique author published in France; Paris: Editions du Seuil
- Georges-Emmanuel Clancier, Evidences
- Michel Deguy, Fragments du cadastre
- Mohammed Dib, Ombre gardienne, with a preface by Louis Aragon
- Jean Follain, Des Heures
- Paul Géraldy, Vous et moi
- Pierre Jean Jouve, Proses
- Pierre Oster, Un nom toujours nouveau
- Saint-John Perse, Chronique
- Jacques Prévert, Histoires
- Tchicaya U Tam'si, À triche-coeur

=== Spanish language ===
==== Latin America ====
- Manuel Blanco-González, La luna et lluvia
- Dolores Castro, Cantares de vela
- Pablo Antonio Cuadra, El jaguar y la luna (Nicaragua), winner of the Rubén Darío Prize
- Manuel Durán, La paloma azul
- Germán Pardo García, Centauro al sol
- León de Greiff, Obras completas, with a preliminary study by Jorge Zalamea (Colombia)
- Carlos García-Prada, editor, Escala del sueño, anthology of 35 Castilian lyrical poets
- Elías Nandino, Nocturna palabra (Mexico)

===== Criticism, scholarship and biography =====
- Emilio Armaza, Eguren, an anthology and analysis of the Peruvian poet's verse
- Antonio Oliver Belmás, Este otro Rubén Darío
- Gastón Figueira, De la vida y la obra de Gabriela Mistral
- Manuel Pedro González, editor, Antología crítica de José Marti, including writing by Darío, Gabriela Mistral, Unamuno, and Onís
- Glen L. Kolb, Juan del Valle y Caviedes, "A Study of the Life, Times and Poetry of a Spanish Colonial Satirist"
- Eduardo Neale-Silva, Horizonte humano, the first detailed biographical study of the Colombian poet José Eustasio Rivera
- Federico de Onís, Luis Palês Matos—vida y obra-bibliografía, antología, poesías, inéditas, a study of the Puerto Rican poet's life and artistic development

=== Other ===
- Odysseus Elytis, Έξη και μια τύψεις για τον ουρανό ("Six Plus One Remorses For The Sky"), Greece
- H. M. Enzensberger, editor, Museum der modernen Poesie, anthology of international modernist poetry, German
- Alaíde Foppa, Los dedos de mi mano ("The Fingers of my Hand"), Guatemalan poet published in Mexico
- Haim Gouri, Shoshanat Ruhot ("Compass Rose"), Israeli writing in Hebrew
- Jess Ørnsbo, Digte ("Poems"), Denmark
- Klaus Rifbjerg, Konfrontation, Denmark
- Kedarnath Singh, Abhi Bilkul Abhi, Allahabad: Natya Sahitya Prakashan; India, Hindi

== Awards and honors ==
- Nobel Prize in Literature: St. John Perse (France)

=== Australia ===
- Grace Leven Prize for Poetry: Colin Thiele, Man in a Landscape

=== United Kingdom ===
- Eric Gregory Award: Christopher Levenson
- Queen's Gold Medal for Poetry: John Betjeman

=== United States ===
- National Book Award for Poetry: Robert Lowell, Life Studies
- Pulitzer Prize for Poetry: W. D. Snodgrass: Heart's Needle
- Bollingen Prize: Delmore Schwartz
- Fellowship of the Academy of American Poets: Jesse Stuart

=== Prizes from other nations ===
- First State Poetry Price (Greece): Odysseus Elytis
- Prix Dante (France): Pierre Jean Jouve
- Canada: Governor General's Award, poetry or drama: Winter Sun, Margaret Avison
- Canada: Governor General's Award, Poésie et théâtre: Poèmes, Anne Hébert

== Births ==
- January 28 – Robert von Dassanowsky, American academic, writer, poet, film and cultural historian and producer
- February 12 – George Elliott Clarke, Canadian poet and playwright
- April 1 – Frieda Hughes, English-born poet, children's writer and painter
- May 5 - Thomas Boberg, Danish poet and travel writer
- August 31 – Makarand Paranjape, Indian poet
- October 30 – Kathleen Flenniken, American writer, poet, editor and educator
- December 22 – Elvis McGonagall, born Richard Smith, Scottish-born slam poet
- Jeffery Donaldson, Canadian poet, critic and theorist
- Katrina Porteous, Scottish-born poet
- Dipti Saravanamuttu, Sri Lankan-Australian poet, academic, journalist and script writer, moves to Australia as a child in 1972
- Alexis Stamatis, Greek poet
- Karenne Wood, Native American poet

== Deaths ==
Birth years link to the corresponding "[year] in poetry" article:

- January 4 – Nima Yooshij, 62 (born 1897), Iranian poet
- January 14 – Ralph Chubb, 77 (born 1892), English poet, printer and artist
- February 21 – Walter D'Arcy Cresswell (born 1896), New Zealand poet
- February 28 – F. S. Flint (born 1885), English poet, translator and prominent member of the Imagist group
- March 23 – Franklin Pierce Adams, 78 (born 1881), American writer whose "The Conning Tower" column gave critical publicity to many poets and writers, translator of poetry
- May 30 – Boris Pasternak, 70 (born 1890), Russian poet and writer, winner of Nobel Prize in Literature 1958, lung cancer
- June 17 – Pierre Reverdy (born 1889), French poet
- August 8 – Harry Kemp, 76 (born 1883), American poet
- August 19 – Frances Cornford (born 1886), English poet
- August 25 – David Diop (born 1927), French West African poet, air crash
- October 9 – Fannie B. Linderman, 85 (born 1875), American poet, writer, educator, entertainer
- October 28 – Margarita Abella Caprile (born 1901), Argentine poet
- October 31 – H. L. Davis, 66 (born 1894), American fiction writer and poet
- November 5 – Richard Rudzitis, 62 (born 1898), Latvian poet, writer and philosopher
- November 9 – Yoshii Isamu 吉井勇 (born 1886), Japanese, Taishō and Shōwa period tanka poet and playwright
- December 25 – H. W. Garrod, 81 (born 1878), English literary scholar

== See also ==
- List of poetry awards
- List of years in poetry
- Poetry
