= Richard Denner =

American poet

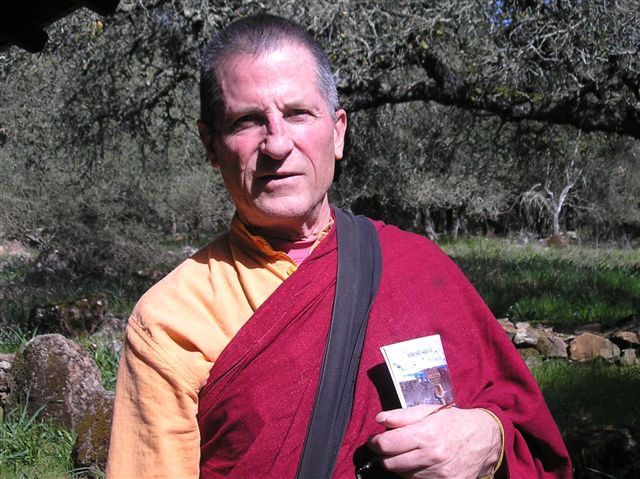
- Richard Denner, March 6, 2007; photograph by Nancy Dougherty
- Born: November 21, 1941 (age 84); Santa Clara, CA
- Occupations: poet, publisher

Richard Denner (born November 21, 1941) is an American poet associated with the Berkeley Street Poets and the Poets of the Pacific Northwest. He is the founder and operator of dPress, which has published over two hundred titles, mostly of poetry and most in chapbook format.

== Biography ==
Denner was born in Santa Clara, California and raised in the Oakland Hills. In 1959, he enrolled in the University of California, Berkeley but dropped out the following year, initially working in Moe's Books and for The Berkeley Barb. "I was trying to be like a street poet," he recalled later, "using magic markers to write on napkins at Cafe Med for espressos, on girls’ arms and feet." Soon after, he founded the one-man printing operation, dPress, the backlists of which now contain some two hundred titles.

seIn 1965, he attended the Berkeley Poetry Conference, what John Bennett, in 'Air Guitar' (an Ellensburg Daily Record column), has called, “an event creating white light intensity that rivaled any drug high and had more staying power.” This convergence of the Black Mountain, San Francisco Renaissance, Beat and Northwest Schools gave Denner the opportunity to study under poets as Charles Olson, Ed Dorn, Robert Creeley, Allen Ginsberg, Joanne Kyger, Lew Welch, and Jack Spicer. Later he would study with Robert Bly, Gary Snyder, Philip Whalen, Denise Levertov and Carolyn Kizer at Fort Worden Center for the Arts in Port Townsend, Washington, but it was Jack Spicer’s molding of poetry series into little books that had the most impact.

In 1972, he went back to college and received a BA in English and Philosophy from the University of Alaska in Fairbanks.

The former proprietor of the Four Winds Bookstore in Ellensburg, Washington, Denner took up the practice of Vajrayana Buddhism. His most recent major work is a long series of cantos in collaboration with David Bromige.

== Works ==
- On Borgo Pass: Poems by Richard Denner was published in 1998 by D Press Sebastopol
- Chain Clankers & Linoleum Nudes: The Poemebooks of Rychard Denner was published in 1998 by D Press Sebastopol
- Collected Poems:1961-2000 was published by Comrades Press in 2001.
- The Collected Books of Richard Denner: Volumes 1-12 are published by dPress.
- Berkeley Daze: Profiles of Berkeley Poets of the 60s edited by Richard Denner, published by dPress, 2008.
