= Berkeley Poetry Conference =

The Berkeley Poetry Conference was an event in which individuals presented their views and poems in seminars, lectures, individual readings, and group readings at California Hall on the campus of the University of California, Berkeley during July 12–24, 1965.

The conference was organized through the University of California Extension Programs. The advisory committee consisted of Thomas Parkinson, Professor of English at U.C. Berkeley, Donald M. Allen, West Coast Editor of Grove Press, Robert Duncan, Poet, and Richard Baker, Program Coordinator.

== Roster ==
The roster of scheduled poets consisted of: Robin Blaser, Robert Creeley, Richard Duerden, Robert Duncan, Allen Ginsberg, Leroi Jones (Amiri Baraka), Joanne Kyger, Ron Loewinsohn, Charles Olson, Gary Snyder, Jack Spicer, George Stanley, Lew Welch, and John Wieners. Leroi Jones (Amiri Baraka) did not participate; Ed Dorn was pressed into service.

== Seminars ==
- July 12 – July 16, Gary Snyder
- July 12 – July 16, Robert Duncan
- July 19 – July 23, LeRoi Jones (scheduled)
- July 19 – July 23, Charles Olson

== Poets ==
- July 12, New Poets
- July 13, Gary Snyder
- July 14, John Wieners
- July 15, Jack Spicer
- July 16, Robert Duncan
- July 17, Robin Blaser, George Stanley and Richard Duerden
- July 19, New Poets
- July 20, Robert Creeley
- July 21, Allen Ginsberg
- July 22, LeRoi Jones
- July 23, Charles Olson
- July 24, Ron Loewinsohn, Joanne Kyger and Lew Welch

== Lectures ==
- July 13, Robert Duncan, Psyche-Myth and the Moment of Truth
- July 14, Jack Spicer, Poetry and Politics
- July 16, Gary Snyder, Poetry and the Primitive
- July 20, Charles Olson, Causal Mythology
- July 21, Ed Dorn, The Poet, the People, the Spirit
- July 22, Allen Ginsberg, What's Happening on Earth
- July 23, Robert Creeley, Sense of Measure

== Readings ==
- July 13, Gary Snyder, introduced by Thomas Parkinson.
- July 14, John Wieners, introduced by Robert Creeley.
- July 15, Jack Spicer, introduced by Thomas Parkinson.
- July 16, Robert Duncan, introduced by Thomas Parkinson.
- July 17, Robin Blaser, George Stanley, Richard Duerden, introduced by Robert Duncan.
- July 18, Young Poets: Jim Boyack, Robin Eichele, Victor Coleman, Bob Hogg, Stephen Rodefer, David Franks, introduced by Victor Coleman.
- July 19, Special Poetry Reading: John Sinclair, Lenore Kandel, Ted Berrigan, Ed Sanders, introduced by Allen Ginsberg.
- July 20, Ed Dorn, introduced by Robert Creeley.
- July 21, Allen Ginsberg, introduced by Thomas Parkinson.
- July 22, Robert Creeley, introduced by Robert Duncan.
- July 23, Charles Olson, introduced by Robert Duncan.
- July 24, Ron Loewinsohn, Joanne Kyger, Lew Welch, introduced by Robert Duncan.
- July 25, Young Poets from the Bay Area: Gene Fowler, Jim Wehlage, Eileen Adams, Doug Palmer, Sam Thomas, Gail Dusenbery, Drum Hadley, Lowell Levant, Jim Thurber, introduced by Gary Snyder.

There was a reading by David Bromige, David Schaff, James Koller and Ken Irby, but the tape has been lost.

Among the younger poets who attended the conference but did not perform were Maria Damon, Ron Silliman, Anne Waldman, and Lewis Warsh. Louis Simpson cited the conference when he resigned his position at Berkeley.

During this event, Charles Olson was designated President of Poets, and Allen Ginsberg, Secretary of State of Poetry. Robert Creeley remarked, "There will never be another poetry conference in Berkeley; Berkeley is too bizarre."

== See also ==
- Poetry
- List of years in poetry
