= Fran Herndon =

American artist (died 2020)

- Born: Fran Herndon c. 1926; North Carolina, U.S.
- Died: May 24, 2020 (aged 94)
- Education: California School of Fine Arts, San Francisco
- Known for: lithographs, painting

Fran Herndon (c. 1926 – May 24, 2020) was an American artist associated with the central poets of the San Francisco Renaissance. Trained at the California School of Fine Arts (now the San Francisco Art Institute) in print-making and painting, Herndon was known for her lithographs and collages, many of which were produced in tandem with Jack Spicer's poetry, and intended for joint viewing and reading. Herndon later branched out to work in drawing and pastels.

Herndon's work has been shown in solo and group exhibitions dating back to at least 1963, during which Herndon's "Grail Series" works were a part of the group exhibit, Exhibit. More recently, Herndon has had three solo shows in 2011 at Altman Siegel Gallery, Canessa Park Gallery, and The Apartment. In 2010, her work was part of the group exhibition, Breathless Days 1959-1960: A Chronotropic Experiment, at the Morris and Helen Belkin Art Gallery. For most of her career, Herndon had no dealer and rarely sold her work, and her reputation was therefore greatest amongst fellow artists and poets. Her silence is typical of the artistic circles she ran in: San Francisco being far off the art map, San Francisco artists indulged in a kind of "nihilism," rarely "took any precautions to preserve their work," and "[d]ocumentation was unheard of." From 2011 she was represented by the Altman Siegel Art Gallery.

== Early life and work ==
Born in North Carolina and of Native American ancestry, Herndon lived for a time in France, where she met her then-husband Jim Herndon. The Herndons settled in San Francisco, where they had two children: Jay Herndon (1957-) and Jack Herndon (1960-). It was in San Francisco that she met the central poets associated with the San Francisco Renaissance: Jack Spicer, Robin Blaser, Robert Duncan, and Jess. More specifically, they were the poets of the Berkeley Renaissance, which was later "absorbed into a broader aesthetic, geographical, and temporal movement called the San Francisco Renaissance", alongside the clashing Beat aesthetics of Allen Ginsberg, Gary Snyder, and Philip Whalen. Her tutelage under and collaborations with Jack Spicer, in particular, resulted in various lithographs created in tandem with Spicer's poetry. His verse "allowed the poetry he wrote while working with Herndon to grow flat, more literal, incantatory, till it approaches the emotionally numb."

== Artistic practices ==
Alongside fellow artists such as Helen Adam, Paul Alexander (American artist), Jess and Tom Field, Herndon contributed to the development of a socially engaged school of art in California that "challenged the values of the East Coast School of Abstract Expressionism." The visual and literary arts were crucial to creating local, West Coast and Bay Area variants of modernism. Her work has been described as one of "quiet [extremism]" and linked, in that way, to other West Coast artists connected to the San Francisco Renaissance such as Harry Jacobus, Jess Collins, Paul Alexander, and Tom Field.

An example of Herndon's early work is her series of collages made in 1963 based on Sports Illustrated. These collages were later published as a part of Jim Herndon's memoirs of the collaboration between Herndon and Jack Spicer, Everything as Expected. Herndon continues to be invested in the convergence of the written and visual arts: her prints continue to be best viewed with "their intended volume of poetry" and her collages often make use of "clipped text swirling about in a manner somewhere between that of Richard F. Outcault's Yellow Kid comics and Richard Hamilton's similar collages."

Spicer impressed upon Herndon his own poetic strategies of "applying practical magic and using allegory to express the existential conflict and social upheaval that was central to the artistic ground swell of the Beat movement" which she, in turn, absorbed and put to use in her own practices of painting and printmaking. As her artistic practice matured, Fran Herndon became Spicer's closest collaborator. In an interview with Lewis Ellingham, she said that "He [Spicer] saw in me something greater than I saw in myself – I think." Writing for SFMOMA's OpenSpace project, Norma Cole stated that "Jack would come over to Fran and Jim Herndon's place in the evening and read the new poems to them. During the day Fran would walk up to the San Francisco Art Institute and create the beautiful, mysterious lithographs that would be in the book with the poems." The close relationships between Herndon's practice and poetic practices, and between Herndon the artist and the many poets who at one point or another drew upon ideas coming out of the San Francisco Renaissance is apparent. At Herndon's 2012 solo exhibition at Vancouver's Blanket Gallery, for example, curator Lee Plested organised a special poetry reading including Meredith Quartermain, Gary Thomas Morse, Robin Blaser's partner, David Farwell, and George Stanley, whose 2003 poetry collection, "A Tall, Serious Girl" features Herndon's painting, "Eye on the Sea." Her works continue to be curated and shown by poets such as Kevin Killian, just as she began her career by "showing at the experimental "poets' galleries" of the period (the Peacock Gallery, Buzz)."

== Editorial work ==
In 1959, Herndon served as the art editor of the poetry/art magazine J, often credited as the first journal of the "mimeo revolution and the harbinger of hundreds of successors in the 60s and 70s." The magazine was produced by Spicer via mimeograph in San Francisco. Herndon's contribution to the magazine was crucial: its "playful, even colorful, formal character thanks to Fran Herndon, who edited the artwork for the magazine" in combination with an "uncompromising editorial stance" led to J's establishment as a "representative of the best of the mimeograph revolution." Together, Spicer and Herndon edited the first five issues of the magazine. J was named after the Herndons' first son, Jay.

== Death ==
Fran Herndon died on May 24, 2020, at the age of 94.

== Solo exhibitions ==
- Blanket Contemporary Art, Vancouver, British Columbia. (2012). Curated by Kevin Killian Guest curated by Lee Plested
- Canessa Park Gallery, San Francisco, California. (2011)
- Altman Siegel Gallery, San Francisco, California. (September–October 2011) Curated by Kevin Killian and Lee Plested
- The Apartment, Vancouver, British Columbia. (2011)
- Canessa Park Gallery, San Francisco, California. (2009)
- Canessa Park Gallery, San Francisco, California. (2005)
- Buzz Gallery, San Francisco, California. (1965) Curated by Paul Alexander, Bill Brodecky, Larry Fagin

== Group exhibitions ==
- Breathless Days 1959-1960: A Chronotropic Experiment, Morris and Helen Belkin Art Gallery, Vancouver, British Columbia. (April - June 2010)
- Other People's Projects: Dodie Bellamy and Kevin Killian, White Columns, New York City, New York. (2006)
- Five Habitats: Squatting at Langton, Week One, New Langton Arts, San Francisco, California. (2006)
- Many Happy Returns, High Energy Constructs, Los Angeles, California. (2006) Organized by Michael Smoler.
- Poetry and its Arts: Bay Area Interactions 1954-2004, California Historical Society, California. (December 2004-April 2005)
- In Search of Orpheus: Some Bay Area Poets & Painters 1945-65, Charles H. Scott Gallery, Vancouver, British Columbia. (1995)
- Jack Spicer Symposium and White Rabbit Conference, Intersection for the Arts, San Francisco, California. (1986)
- Peacock Gallery, San Francisco, California. (October–November 1963) Curated by Robin Blaser

== Collections ==
- Death of Kid Paret, 1963, Morris and Helen Belkin Art Gallery
- "Jack Spicer on the Beach", 1962, Morris and Helen Belkin Art Gallery
- "Portrait of Robin Blaser", 1963, Morris and Helen Belkin Art Gallery

== Catalogues ==
- Benzan, Carla, Allison Collins, Shaun Dacey, Aldona Dziedziejko, Darrin Martens, Sarah Todd, and Scott Watson. Breathless Days: 1959-1960.
- Alexander, Paul, Lyn Brockway, Ralph T. Field, Fran Herndon, Harry Jacobus, and Jess. Exhibition. Peacock Gallery, 1963.
