= Niagara Frontier Review =

American literary magazine

Niagara Frontier Review was an annual small magazine of poetry and prose, edited by Charles Olson, Harvey Brown, and Charles Boer [Brover]. The magazine was published by Harvey Brown in Buffalo, New York, during the years 1964–1966 and ran three issues. It was associated with Charles Olson, then at SUNY Buffalo, San Francisco Renaissance poets, and New York avant-garde poets and jazz musicians. Submissions included those by Robert Creeley, Robert Kelly, Leroi Jones (Amira Baraka), Ed Dorn, John Wieners, Ray Bremser, Robert Duncan, Gary Snyder, John Temple, Diane DiPrima, Albert Glover, Fred Wah, the jazz musician Don Cherry, Stephen Rodefer, Herbert Huncke, Charles Boer, Andrew Crozier and Charles Olson. The third issue also carried Cantos CX and 116 by Ezra Pound.
