= Man in a Landscape =

Man in a Landscape may refer to:

- Man in a Landscape (TV series), a Canadian cultural documentary television series
- Man in a Landscape (poetry collection), a poetry collection by Colin Thiele
