= David Bromige =

American poet

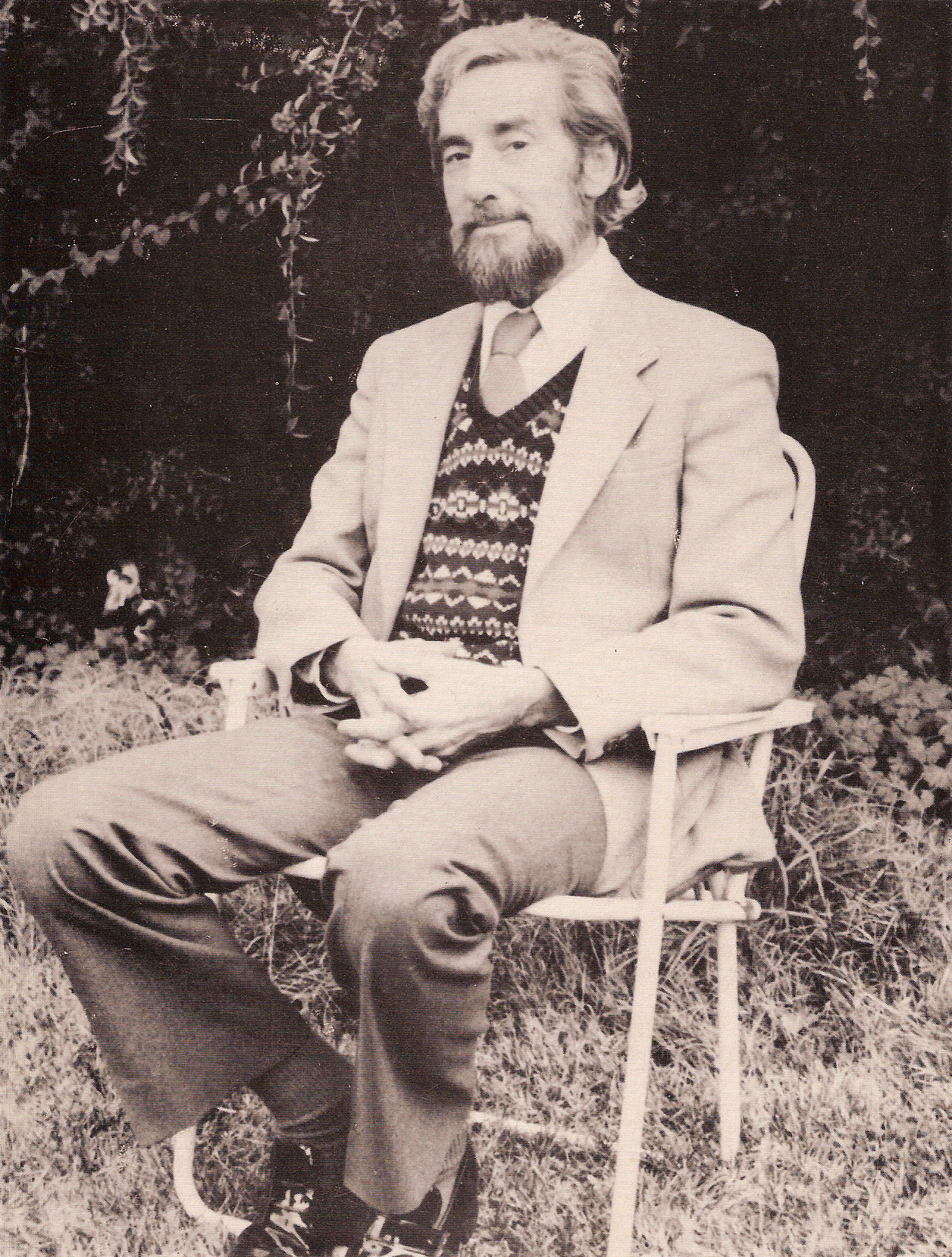
- David Bromige, c. 1986; photograph by Christopher Bromige
- Born: October 22, 1933; London, England
- Died: June 3, 2009 (aged 75); Sebastopol, California
- Occupations: Poet, professor

David Mansfield Bromige (October 22, 1933 – June 3, 2009) was a Canadian-American poet who resided in northern California from 1962 onward. Bromige published thirty books, many so different from one another as to appear to be the work of a different author. Associated in his youth with the New American Poetry and especially with Robert Duncan and Robert Creeley, Bromige is sometimes associated with the language poets, but this connection is based more on his close friendships with some of those poets, and their admiration for his work. It is difficult to fit Bromige into a slot. He departs from language poetry in the thematic unity of many of his poems, in the uses to which he puts found materials, with the romantic aspect of his lyricism, and with the sheer variety of his approaches to the poem.

== Early life ==
Bromige was born in London, England. At an early age, he showed signs of being tubercular and was sent to an isolation hospital, but after four months, his condition improved, and he was discharged. That hospital was the first of four crucial interludes, which molded his adult life. The second of these interludes came during the London Blitz. A stick of bombs falling in their customary sequence appeared likely to destroy the Bromiges’ house, with them inside. The next interlude involves his schooling and work experience. When the war ended, Bromige won a scholarship to Haberdashers' Aske's Hampstead School and a chance to study at a socially superior school. After completing his School Certificate, Bromige accepted an offer to be a dairyman on a farm in southern Sweden. Each of these interludes changed him. The first made him suspicious of his family; the bombing made him vow to be someone else; work and study gave him the worldly experience to be a poet.

== Becoming a poet ==
He met other poets at the University of British Columbia such as George Bowering, Fred Wah, Frank Davey, David Dawson, and Jamie Reid, and they encouraged him to write and publish his work. At the 1963 Vancouver Poetry Festival Bromige met Robert Creeley, Charles Olson, Denise Levertov, Allen Ginsberg, and Robert Duncan.

The result of this endeavor led to the publication of many poems. Robert Hass, the chairman of the Western States Book Award Committee, wrote glowingly of his work and chose his 1988 book, Desire: Selected Poems, 1963-1987 to win the first prize for poetry. He has twice been honored by the Poetry Foundation, once with a $3,000 and again with a $10,000 prize. And he has twice been honored by the National Endowment for the Arts. He won the college prize for the first poem he ever published.

Three years later, Bromige won a Woodrow Wilson Scholarship. The rules stated that he had to do his graduate work at a different university. In 1962, he chose the University of California at Berkeley after graduating from the University of British Columbia. At UC-Berkeley, Bromige studied with Frederick Crews, Stephen Booth, and Thomas Parkinson. Living in the Bay Area also brought him into contact with a younger generation of American poets, including Ron Loewinsohn, Michael Palmer, Ron Silliman, David Melnick, Kathleen Fraser, Kenneth Irby, Rae Armantrout, Bob Perelman, Harvey Bialy, Robert Grenier, Stephen Ratcliffe, Pat Nolan, Alistair Johnson and more.

In 1968, his third book, The Ends of the Earth, was published by Black Sparrow Press. It was the beginning of a twenty-three-year partnership that produced eleven of his books. The poems in this book have a ghostly tone. It is as though Cocteau was doing a very detailed description of Bromige's life. The change apparent in his fifth book, Threads, is startling. It reads as though the ghostly presences from The Ends of the Earth had fleshed out and learned to speak a language from the various lives whose talk fills the book.

== Academic career ==
Leaving UC-Berkeley A.B.D., (All but dissertation), Bromige took a teaching position in the English Department at Sonoma State University in 1970. Then came seven books in two years. This is Bromige at an early peak. Ten Years in the Making began it. This book consisted of some of his early work, going back to 1960, work engagingly open to the merest reader. Then come selections from The Gathering, followed by poems from Threads. Next came Birds of the West, from Victor Coleman of Coachhouse Press in Toronto. This book consists of three sections: a journal of gardening and visitors; a section of more finished poems, filled with a landscape of Western Sonoma County; and a single, long poem written in sparse triplets to reflect a white-tail kite's hovering flight.

Soon afterwards, Tight Corners and What’s Around Them was issued by Black Sparrow. Bromige has stated it was the most interesting to him of this clutch of books. "I was using a fairly familiar sort of sentence, in prose, with a last line that either boosted sales or fell flat as a flapjack. I didn’t care. Banal or brilliant, it made no difference in the world I was living in. Besides, sometimes the banal turned brilliant as I listened."

He also did three pint-sized books about this time for the "Sparrow" series. In 1974, he also published a book of occasional poems, Spells and Blessings.

Bromige continued to publish prodigiously in magazines and, in 1980, published a book called My Poetry.

The 1980s started with a Pushcart Prize for My Poetry and ended with the Western States Poetry Award for his selected poems, Desire. In between, Bromige devoted himself to his wife and young daughter while carrying a full-time professor's responsibilities in the English Department at Sonoma State University. He coordinated poetry conferences at SSU, published a collaboration with Opal Nations, wrote an analysis of Allen Fisher's four-day residency at Langton Street in San Francisco, and was himself the subject of an issue of Tom Beckett's The Difficulties. In 1990, John Martin, who had moved Black Sparrow Press to Santa Rosa, published Men, Women & Vehicles, a book of selected prose.

Bromige retired early from Sonoma State University in 1993, and he continued to publish and give readings. Tiny Courts in a World Without Scales, Brick Books, is a book of fifty short poems, showing Bromige at his droll and sarcastic best. He had fun with They Ate, a cut up from a turn-of-the-century detective novel, before producing A Cast of Tens (Avec Press). Each stanza has 10 lines but in each poem is distributed variously. The Harbormaster of Hong Kong (Sun and Moon) came next with many kinds of writing in it including a perfect sonnet. Bromige's final book from the 90's was Vulnerable Bundles, a limited edition of thirty, from Potes and Poets Press.

Missing teaching, Bromige returned to it part-time at the University of San Francisco, and he also began writing what would later be As in T as in Tether, which was awarded A Best Book of the Year (2003) recognition from Small Press Traffic. Bromige published Indictable Suborners and Behave or Be Bounced with dPress, Sebastopol, in 2003. For the past few years, Bromige had been collaborating with poet and dPress editor Richard Denner on 100 Cantos. Spade: Cantos 1-33 was published in 2006.

Bromige lived in Sebastopol, California. He died on June 3, 2009, of complications from diabetes.

== Bibliography ==
- The Gathering. Buffalo, NY: Sumbooks, 1965.
- Please, Like Me. Los Angeles, CA: Black Sparrow Press, 1968.
- The Ends of the Earth. Los Angeles, CA: Black Sparrow Press, 1968.
- The Quivering Roadway. Berkeley, CA: Archangel Press, 1969.
- Threads. Los Angeles, CA: Black Sparrow Press, 1970.
- Three Stories. Los Angeles, CA: Black Sparrow Press, 1973.
- Ten Years in the Making. Vancouver, BC: New Star Press, 1974.
- Tight Corners & What's Around Them. Los Angeles, CA: Black Sparrow Press, 1974.
- Birds of the West. Toronto, Ontario: Coach House Books, 1974.
- Out of My Hands. Santa Barbara, CA: Black Sparrow Press, 1974.
- Spells & Blessings. Vancouver, BC: Talonbooks, 1975.
- Credences of Winter. Santa Barbara, CA: Black Sparrow Press, 1976.
- Living in Advance (with deBarros and Gifford). Cotati, CA: Open Ready Press, 1976.
- My Poetry. Berkeley, CA: The Figures Press, 1980.
- P-E-A-C-E. Berkeley, CA: Tuumba Press, 1981.
- In the Uneven Steps of Hung Chow. Berkeley, CA: Little Dinosaur Press, 1982.
- It's the Same Only Different/The Melancholy Owed Categories. Weymouth, England: Last Straw Press, 1984.
- You See, Parts 1 & 2 (with Opal Nations). San Francisco, CA: Exempli Gratia Press, 1986.
- Red Hats. Atwater, OH: Tonsure Press, 1986.
- Desire: Selected Poems 1963-1987. Santa Rosa, CA: Black Sparrow Press, 1988.
- Men, Women & Vehicles: Prose Works. Santa Rosa, CA: Black Sparrow Press, 1990.
- Tiny Courts in a Year Without Scales. London, ON: Brick Books 1991.
- They Ate. Sebastopol, CA: X-Press Books, 1992.
- The Harbormaster of Hong Kong. Los Angeles, CA: Sun & Moon Press, 1993.
- A Cast of Tens. Penngrove, CA: Avec Books, 1994.
- Vulnerable Bundles. Hartford, CT: Cricket Press, 1995.
- From the First Century. 1995.
- Piccolo Mondo. Toronto, Ontario: Coach House Books, 1998.
- Authenticizing. San Francisco, CA: a+bend press, 2000.
- As in T, As in Tether. Tucson, AZ: Chax Press, 2002.
- Indictable Suborners. Sebastopol, CA: DPress 2003.
- Behave or Be Bounced. Sebastopol, CA: dPress, 2003.
- Ten Poems from Clearings in the Throat. Sebastopol, CA dPress, 2005.
- Spade (with Richard Denner). Sebastopol, CA: dPress, 2006.
- if wants to be the same as is: Essential Poems of David Bromige, edited by Jack Krick, Bob Perelman and Ron Silliman, with an introduction by George Bowering, Vancouver, BC: NewStar Books, 2018.
