= James Herndon =

James Herndon may refer to:

- James Herndon (writer) (1926–1990), American writer and educator
- James Herndon (drag queen) (1892–1983), American drag queen
- Jimmy Herndon (born 1973), American football player
- J. Marvin Herndon (born 1944), American scientist and conspiracy theorist
