= Madeline Gleason =

American poet

Madeline Gleason

Madeline Gleason (January 26, 1903 – April 22, 1979) was a United States poet, dramatist, and founder of the San Francisco Poetry Guild. In 1947, she became the director of the first poetry festival in the United States, laying the groundwork (along with other figures such as Kenneth Rexroth, Robert Duncan, William Everson, Jack Spicer, James Broughton, et al.) for what became known as the San Francisco Renaissance. She was, with Helen Adam, Barbara Guest, and Denise Levertov, one of only four women whose work was included in Donald Allen's landmark anthology, The New American Poetry 1945-1960 (1960).

== Early life and work ==
Gleason was born in Fargo, North Dakota and was the only child of Catholic parents. She attended the Catholic parish school, where she was viewed as something of a problem child. She and a cousin toured the Midwest, singing and tap-dancing in vaudeville shows.

When her mother died, she and her father moved to Portland, Oregon, where she started working in a bookstore and wrote poetry which she circulated in manuscript form. She published a series of articles on poetry and poets in a local newspaper.

== San Francisco ==
In 1934, Gleason moved to San Francisco, California to work on a history of California for the WPA Writer's Project. Two years later, a sequence of her poems was published in Poetry. For a number of years, she worked with the composer John Edmunds, translating songs by Schumann, Schubert and J. S. Bach. The pair also organised song festivals.

Her first book, Poems, was published in 1944. By this time, she had moved to Phoenix, Arizona because of the war, but she soon returned to San Francisco and took up a job with a brokerage firm.

== San Francisco Renaissance ==
In April 1947, Gleason organized the First Festival of Modern Poetry at Marcelle Labaudt's Lucien Labaudt Gallery, 1407 Gough Street, San Francisco. Gleason had roots in the Berkeley Renaissance, and so could provide the framework for an initial (and sanctioned) gathering of voices who inspired a generation.

In the space of two evenings, with twelve poets, including William Everson, Muriel Rukeyser, Kenneth Rexroth, Robert Duncan and Jack Spicer, Madeline Gleason read and performed for an audience of young poets and poetry lovers. This was the beginning of another movement, at least in the public's eye, that would coalesce in San Francisco on October 7, 1955—at the Six Gallery on Fillmore Street—with Allen Ginsberg's Howl, a Reading that has gone down in history as the moment of conception of the Beat movement.

== Later life and works ==
Gleason's second book, The Metaphysical Needle appeared in 1949, but her third, Concerto for Bell and Telephone, was not published until 1966. Although she had continued with writing and involvement in the San Francisco artistic scene, as well as writing a number of plays, Gleason had, to some extent, become a victim of the Renaissance's success. The Beat poets she had helped promote had become so successful that it was hard for less high-profile poets to find publishers.

However, she continued to give readings and taught creative writing classes, both at San Francisco State University and in her home. In 1973, her Selected Poems was published, followed in 1975 by Here Comes Everybody: New and Selected Poems. Gleason continued writing right up to her death. Her Collected Poems was published in 1999.

== Selected works ==
- Poems, 1944
- The Metaphysical Needle, 1949
- Concerto for Bell and Telephone, 1966
