= Ron Loewinsohn =

American poet

- Born: December 15, 1937; Iloilo, Philippines
- Died: October 14, 2014 (aged 76); Berkeley, California, United States
- Occupations: Poet; Author; Professor
- Writing career
- Period: 20th and 21st Century American and British Literature
- Notable works: Contributor to Donald Allen's The New American Poetry 1945–1960; Watermelons
- Literary movement: Beat Generation
- Website: Berkeley Daze website

Ronald William Loewinsohn (December 15, 1937 – October 14, 2014) was an American poet and novelist who was associated with the poetry of the San Francisco Renaissance since his inclusion in Donald Allen's 1960 poetry anthology, The New American Poetry 1945–1960. He was professor emeritus of English at the University of California, Berkeley.

== Education and career ==
Born in Iloilo, Philippines, Loewinsohn and his family relocated to Los Angeles in the United States in 1945. They later lived in The Bronx and then settled in San Francisco, where he lived until 1967. Loewinsohn credits this proximity to North Beach with his own development as a poet: "I graduated from Abraham Lincoln High School in 1955, with the Beat generation happening all around me. I met all of the principals, heard Ginsberg, Snyder, Whalen and McClure read in Berkeley in April 1956, and continued to write, mostly poetry, in that vernacular and (I thought) oracular mode." Loewinsohn then traveled, married in 1957, and worked as a lithographer for 12 years. In 1959, he published his first collection of poetry, Watermelons, which contained an introduction by Allen Ginsberg and a prefatory letter by William Carlos Williams. He also co-edited the little magazine Change with Richard Brautigan. The poets who were most influential on his work included William Carlos Williams, Allen Ginsberg, Robert Duncan, Jack Spicer, Richard Brautigan, Philip Whalen, Gary Snyder, Charles Olson, Robert Creeley, and Denise Levertov.

In the early 1960s, Loewinsohn taught a poetry workshop at San Francisco State University Extension, an experience which made him realize that he wanted to be a teacher. He received a B.A. from the University of California, Berkeley in 1967 and Ph.D. from the Harvard University in 1971 (his dissertation was on William Carlos Williams). He joined the faculty of the department of English at University of California, Berkeley in 1970 and retired in 2005. His papers are archived in Stanford University's Department of Special Collections and University Archives.

== Publications ==
- Watermelons, New York: Totem Press, 1959
- Poetry included in Donald Allen's The New American Poetry 1945–1960 (1960) by Grove Press
- The World of the Lie (poems), Change Press, 1963
- L'Autre (poems), Black Sparrow Press, 1967
- Lying Together; Turning the Head & Shifting the Weight: The Produce District, & Other Places; Moving - A Spring Poem, Black Sparrow Press, 1967
- The Step (poems), Black Sparrow Press, 1968
- The Sea, around us (poem) Black Sparrow Press 1968
- Meat Air (Selected Poems), Harcourt Brace, 1970
- The Leaves (poems), Black Sparrow Press, 1973
- William C. Williams: The Embodiment of Knowledge, (Editor)
- Goat Dances (poems) Black Sparrow Press, 1976
- Poetry included in Donald Allen's The Postmoderns, (1982) by Grove Press
- Magnetic Field(s) (novel), Knopf, 1983
- Where All the Ladders Start (novel), Atlantic Monthly Press, 1987

== Awards and honors ==
- Poets Foundation Award (1963)
- The Irving Stone Award of the Academy of American Poets (1966)
- The Ina Coolbrith Memorial Prize for Poetry (1966)
- The University of California Scholar Award (1967)
- Woodrow Wilson Foundation graduate fellowship (1967–68)
- Harvard University fellowship (1967–1970)
- National Education Association Fellowship (1979 and 1986)
- Guggenheim Fellowship (1984–85)

== Media ==
Poetry reading

- Ron Loewinsohn at SGWU, 1970 (with Robert Hogg) - Concordia University

Video clip

- Literature of the Beat Generation - Ron Loewinsohn – OLLI @ University of California, Berkeley
