= A Sense of Place =

- Written by: James Acland
- Presented by: James Acland
- Country of origin: Canada
- Original language: English
- No. of seasons: 1

Production
- Executive producer: Vincent Tovell

Original release
- Network: CBC Television
- Release: 4 October – 25 October 1966

A Sense of Place is a Canadian television program that aired on CBC Television in 1966.

== Premise ==
The program, hosted by University of Toronto professor James Acland, examined modern Canadian architecture for selected Canadian projects that were built in the mid-1960s. Episodes included commentary by the architects involved in their respective projects.

Acland previously discussed architectural subjects in CBC documentaries such as Man in a Landscape during the 1960s.

== Episodes ==
- 4 October 1966: Introduction and preview of the following episodes
- 11 October 1966: Simon Fraser University, designed by a Vancouver firm headed by Arthur Erickson and Geoffrey Massey
- 18 October 1966: Scarborough College (University of Toronto), by John Andrews
- 25 October 1966: Habitat 67, by Moshe Safdie

== Scheduling ==
The program aired at 10:30 p.m. on Thursdays from 4 to 25 October 1966.
