= Kirby Doyle =

American poet (1932–2003)

- Born: Stanton Doyle; November 27, 1932; San Francisco, California, U.S.
- Died: April 5, 2003 (aged 70); San Francisco, California, U.S.
- Education: San Francisco State University
- Occupation: Poet

Kirby Doyle (November 27, 1932 – April 5, 2003), born Stanton Doyle, was an American poet. He was featured in the New American Poetry anthology, with the so-called "third generation" of American modernist poets. He was one of the San Francisco Renaissance poets who laid the groundwork for Beat poetry in San Francisco. Doyle also wrote novels.

== Life and literary work ==
Doyle was born in San Francisco, California. A United States Army veteran, Doyle was pursuing art and culinary studies at San Francisco State University when he published several poems in the school's literary magazine. This led to his association with Robert Duncan, Lew Welch, and Kenneth Rexroth. But Doyle stressed the directness of the spoken word over formal poetry. In the late 1950s, Doyle wrote Sapphobones, a collection of playful and evocative love poems, which cemented his literary reputation.

Words like mad exotic birds fluttering
from my thorax
whipping my speech -- moist and gaudy feathers
gone from my lips upward.

and in your sleep I awake here
have eaten an orange
have gone to the creek and bathed
listening to its thin and liquid speech
its joy to run so free and clean
Now, returning to this ragged tent
sanctuary to your sleep, your real sleep,
I wish for you waking
so that we together could take cool pause
at the hidden pond I found down stream
our bodies quick and chilled
by the water,
our bodies breathing - holding

— From "Poem To A Mountain Girl"

His work appeared alongside that of Jack Kerouac, Lawrence Ferlinghetti, and Allen Ginsberg in the Summer, 1958 issue of Chicago Review, which was devoted to "San Francisco Renaissance" writers. Several of his poems were published on broadsheets by the Communication Company, the publishing arm of the Diggers.

Although his work maintained the directness of colloquial speech, it could also be lyrical and rhapsodic. Doyle's poems were sometimes humorous. He was a Romantic at heart. He adored the works of John Keats, Emily Dickinson and the great 'projective verse' of Charles Olson.

Doyle was a mainstay of the North Beach literary scene in San Francisco from the late seventies until his incarceration in Laguna Honda hospital for dementia and the effects of diabetes. Prior to that he had lived for long stretches of time on communes near Mount Tamalpais. The poet Michael McClure said of him: "He was a handsome, big-smiled Irish American rascal. He was an original Beat, loose-jointed, with a great laugh. His poetry was beautiful stuff."

Doyle died on April 5, 2003, in Laguna Honda Hospital in San Francisco. He was one of the few writers of the San Francisco Renaissance who were both born and died in the city.

== Publications ==
- Sapphobones (Poets Press, 1966)
- Ode to John Garfield (Communication Company, 1967)
- Angel Faint (Communication Company, 1968; Deep Forest,1991)
- Happiness Bastard (Essex House, 1968; a novel). (Happiness Bastard, like Kerouac's On the Road, was produced on one continuous scroll of paper run through a typewriter, and the sole copy is in the Kirby Doyle Archive in the possession of Tisa Walden which also includes the unpublished Opus Pre American Ode, and other handwritten papers.
- The Collected Poems of Kirby Doyle (Greenlight Press,1983)
- After Olson (Deep Forest,1984)
- The Questlock: Gymnopaean of A. Dianaei O'Tamal (Deep Forest,1987)
- Lyric Poems (City Lights, 1988)
- Crime, Justice & Tragedy and Das Erde Profundus (Deep Forest,1989)
- Pre American Ode (unpublished)
- White Flesh (unpublished; novel)

== Recordings ==
- Howls, Raps & Roars: Recordings from the San Francisco poetry renaissance (compilation) (Universal Music Group, 1963; Fantasy Records 1993). Click HERE to listen to Doyle read Angel Faint from this compilation (you must have Windows Media Player).
