= James Herndon (writer) =

James Herndon (1926–1990) was an American writer and educator. He is best known for two memoirs of teaching, The Way It Spozed To Be and How To Survive In Your Native Land. He is considered one of the influential 1970s writers on education, among the ranks of John Holt, George Dennison, Jonathan Kozol, Paul Goodman, and Herbert Kohl.

== Writing career ==
Herndon's first book, The Way It Spozed To Be (1968), chronicles his first year teaching, in a poor, segregated junior high school in urban California. This book describes his despair at the inadequacy of the school system and his innovative efforts to teach his students to read, which led to his being fired at the end of the year for poor classroom management.

Herndon's second book How To Survive In Your Native Land (1971) centers on Herndon's subsequent decade teaching. Its humorous, Beat style led reviewers to compare Herndon to Kurt Vonnegut.

In 1973, Herndon privately published Everything As Expected, an account of his then-wife Fran Herndon's collage collaborations with poet Jack Spicer. The Herndons were part of Jack Spicer's circle in San Francisco.

Sorrowless Times, James Herndon's memoir of his years as a merchant marine during World War II, was published in 1981.

In 1985, Herndon published Notes From A Schoolteacher, further musings on American education, including his reflections on his role as president of his local teachers' union.

== Bibliography ==
- The Way It Spozed To Be. 1968. ISBN 0-86709-407-9
- How To Survive In Your Native Land. 1971. New edition 1997. ISBN 0-86709-408-7
- Everything as Expected. 1973.
- Sorrowless Times. 1981. ISBN 0-671-24321-7
- Notes From A Schoolteacher. 1985. ISBN 0-671-62816-X
