= The Collected Books of Jack Spicer =

Book by Jack Spicer

- Editor: Robin Blaser
- Author: Jack Spicer
- Language: English
- Genre: Poetry
- Publisher: Black Sparrow Press
- Publication date: 1st edition Copyright 1975 by the Estate of Jack Spicer
- Publication place: United States
- Media type: Print (Hardback & Paperback)
- Pages: 382 pp (first edition, hardback)
- ISBN: 0-87685-241-X (pbk.) ISBN 0-87685-242-8 (hard)
- OCLC: 1288450
- Dewey Decimal: 811/.5/4
- LC Class: PS3569.P47 A6 1975

The Collected Books of Jack Spicer first appeared in 1975, ten years after the death of Jack Spicer. It was "edited & with a commentary by Robin Blaser" and published in Santa Rosa, California by Black Sparrow Press. A primary document of the San Francisco Renaissance, The Collected Books of Jack Spicer has arguably reached the status of a twentieth century "classic" and helped to define an emerging countertradition to the prevailing literary establishment. Since this edition has gone out of print, it has been updated, revised and republished as My Vocabulary Did This To Me. The Collected Poetry of Jack Spicer, edited by Peter Gizzi and Kevin Killian (Wesleyan University Press, 2008).

== Contents of The Collected Books of Jack Spicer ==
The contents page of The Collected Books of Jack Spicer (Fifth Printing, 1996) is divided into four sections:

=== First (1) section ===
Reprints twelve books of poetry composed between 1957-1965 and in (for the most part) chronological order.

(Only the title is listed on the contents page. However, each title page itself lists a date and, in some cases, a subtitle. These are shown below)

- After Lorca, With an Introduction by Federico García Lorca, 1957
- Admonitions, 1958
- A Book of Music, with words by Jack Spicer, 1958
- Billy the Kid, 1958
- Fifteen False Propositions Against God, 1958
- A Red Wheelbarrow, [1968]
- Apollo Sends Seven Nursery Rhymes to James Alexander,
- Lament for The Makers, 1961
- Heads of the Town up to the Aether, ("Homage to Creeley"; "A Fake Novel About The

Life of Arthur Rimbaud"; "A Textbook of Poetry"), 1960–61

- The Holy Grail, ("The Book of Gawain", "The Book of Percival", "The Book of

Lancelot", "The Book of Gwenivere", "The Book of Merlin", "The Book of Galahad", "The Book of the Death of Arthur"), 1962

- Language, ("Thing Language", "Love Poems", "Intermissions", "Transformations",

"Morphemics", "Phonemics", "Graphemics"), 1964

- Book of Magazine Verse, (Poems: "for The Nation", "for Poetry Chicago",

"for Tish", "for Ramparts", "for The St. Louis Sporting News", "for the Vancouver Festival", "for Downbeat"), (no date follows)

=== Second (2) section ===
"The Practice of Outside", an essay by Robin Blaser.

=== Third (3) section ===
"Poems & Documents" which lists the following:

- Imaginary Elegies I-VI
- The Unvert Manifesto
- Song for Bird and Myself
- Poem to the Reader of the Poem
- "Poetry as Magic" Workshop Questionnaire
- The Trojan Wars Reviewed: A Capitulation
- Troy Poem

=== Fourth (4) section ===
"Bibliography of First Editions"
