= Bonnie Bremser =

American Beat writer

Bonnie Bremser (b. 1939), born Brenda Frazer, is a Beat writer and protofeminist figure known for her epistolary memoir Troia: Mexican Memoirs, also published in the U.K. as For Love of Ray.

== Life and career ==
Bremser was born Brenda Frazer in 1939 in Washington, D.C. She briefly attended Sweet Briar College in Virginia before dropping out to marry Ray Bremser, whom she'd met three weeks earlier.

Bremser and her husband and infant daughter fled to Mexico in 1961 because her husband was wanted for parole violation. In Mexico, she engaged in sex work at the urging of her husband. After Ray Bremser was jailed in 1963, Bonnie Bremser sent him weekly two-page letters chronicling their journey in Mexico and her experience of sex work. She has said the couple told jail authorities that the letters were business correspondence to get around a one-page personal letter maximum. Those letters later were compiled into Troia: Mexican Memoirs, originally published in 1969. The word "troia" is Italian slang, meaning "sow" or "whore," but also references Helen of Troy.

Troia was republished in 2007, drawing renewed interest to Bremser's life and work.

== Reception ==
Troia has been described as a "lost classic of experimental writing that speaks the movement’s aesthetics and ethos from the vantage of a woman living the 'beat' life." Bremser's work frequently draws comparisons to Jack Kerouac for her autobiographical chronicle of life on the road. Since the republishing of Troia, Bremser has also drawn recognition for her awareness of gender and race and her attitude toward those issues, which was nuanced especially for the 1950s and among the Beats.
