= Joanne Kyger =

American poet (1934–2017)

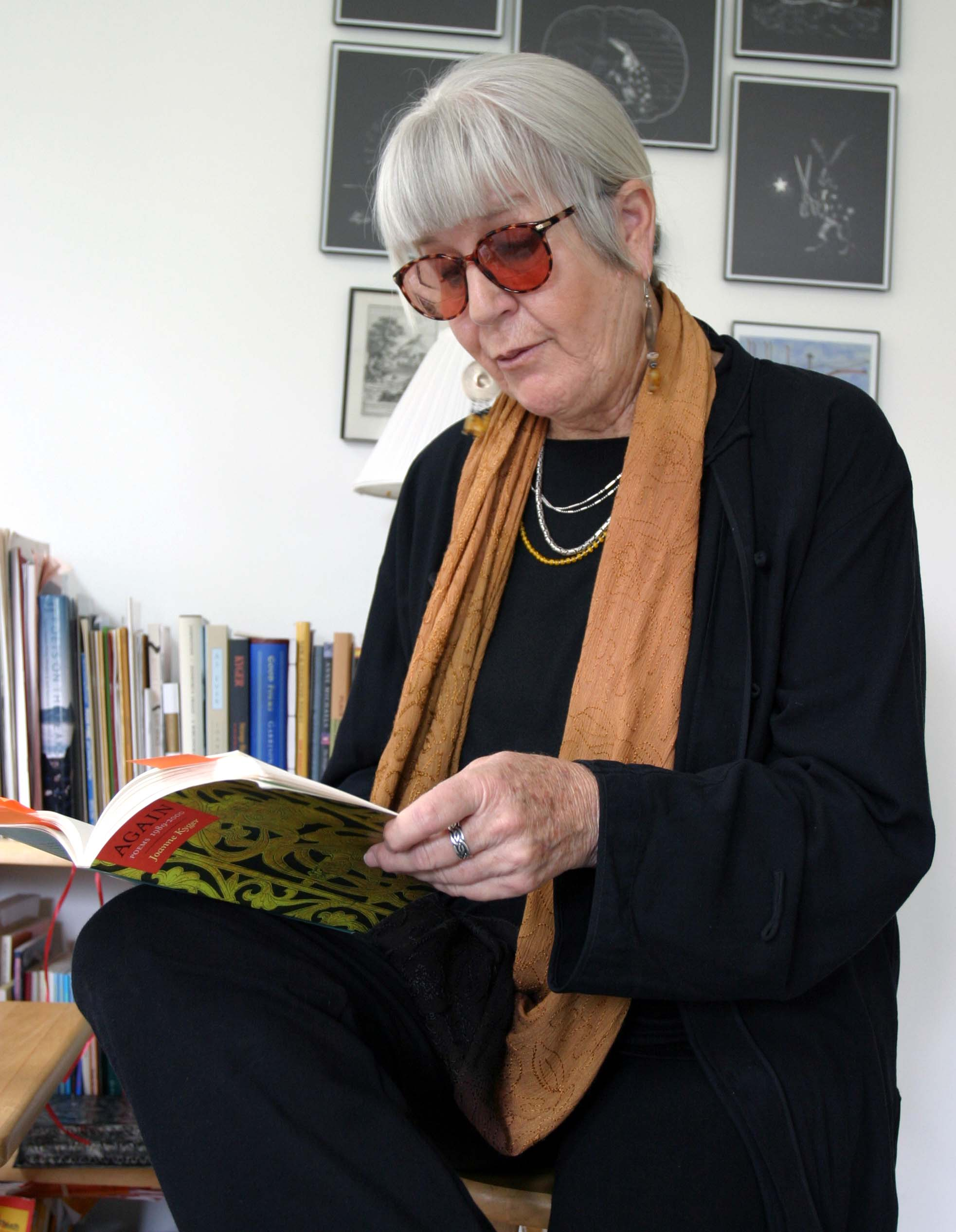
- Kyger photographed by Gloria Graham reading from Again: Poems 1989–2000 during a videotaping for the installation Add-Verse, 2004
- Born: November 19, 1934; Vallejo, California, U.S.
- Died: March 22, 2017 (aged 82); Bolinas, California, U.S.
- Cause of death: Lung cancer
- Education: University of California, Santa Barbara
- Occupations: Poet, writer
- Writing career
- Period: 1959–2017
- Notable works: About Now: Collected Poems; As Ever: Selected Poems; The Japan and India Journals 1960–1964; See Bibliography
- Literary movement: San Francisco Renaissance, Beat Generation, Black Mountain Poets, New York School

Joanne Kyger (November 19, 1934 – March 22, 2017) was an American poet. The author of over 30 books of poetry and prose, Kyger was associated with the poets of the San Francisco Renaissance, the Beat Generation, Black Mountain, and the New York School.

Although Kyger is often characterized as a prominent female Beat poet in the predominately male inner circle of Beat Generation writers, she never considered herself as belonging to the Beat movement. Nor did she formally identify with any other movement; her work invokes various schools of poetry without belonging to any of them. In Reconstructing the Beats, Amy L. Friedman calls Kyger "an important link between several major axes of American poetry and writing in the twentieth century." Linda Russo, in the webzine Jacket's edition devoted to Kyger, notes that "there is no one way to talk about her work except as that of a singular individual."

Kyger's early poetry was influenced by Charles Olson's "projective verse" concept of letting breath and open construction, rather than rhyme and syntax, guide poetic composition. This influence continued to shape her mature work. In a 2010 interview Kyger says, "You want to make it so that someone could say it. I try to 'score' the lines for the page with that in mind, the breathing, the timing." Unlike Olson, notes Dale Smith in his essay "Joanne Kyger and the Narrative of Every Day," Kyger "focuses on events and happenings, moving herself out of the way as a kind of recording instrument . . . faithful to specific moments in time and attendant to the many spirits or moods of landscape." In a 2007 review of Kyger's book About Now: Collected Poems, Lewis MacAdams describes Kyger as from the "School of Backyard Poets, who look out their kitchen windows and see the universe."

Kyger's poems emerged from a daily literary practice of recording thoughts, events, and dreams. Most of the poems are dated, either in the title or at the end. Much like journals, they include everything from philosophical musings to the weather. Themes—arising from her practice of Zen Buddhism, study of consciousness, explorations of ancient Greek and Native American mythologies, frequent travels to Mexico, observations of the natural landscape, and daily life in a small coastal town—continue from book to book, like installments in an autobiography. In a 2011 interview, Kyger says, "I think of notebook writing like a practice—I try and do it whether I have anything good or bad or interesting to say. And the chronology becomes the narrative, a history of a writing 'self.'"

== Biography ==
=== Early life and education ===
Joanne Elizabeth Kyger was born on November 19, 1934, in Vallejo, California, to Jacob Kyger, a Navy captain, and Anne (Lamont) Kyger, a Santa Barbara, California, city employee of Canadian descent. Kyger moved often, living in China, California, Illinois, and Pennsylvania, until the age of 14, when the family (including Kyger's two sisters) settled in Santa Barbara. Her parents separated permanently in 1949.

Kyger's first published poem appeared in her school's literary magazine when she was five. At Santa Barbara High School, Kyger co-edited the features column of the school newspaper with Leland Hickman. In 1952, she enrolled at Santa Barbara College (later University of California, Santa Barbara), where she studied philosophy and literature and started the school's first literary magazine. Renowned critic Hugh Kenner introduced her to the works of Modernist poets, such as W. B. Yeats and William Carlos Williams, while Paul Wienpahl introduced her to the works of Wittgenstein and Heidegger. In her 2015 notes from an earlier interview, Kyger recalls that the philosophers inspired her interest in Zen Buddhism: "Heidegger had come to the study of 'nothing.' Then I found D. T. Suzuki's book on Japanese Zen and I thought, Oh! this is where you go with this mind. This 'nothing' is really 'something.'" Kyger left the university in 1956, one freshman biology course short of a degree in philosophy and literature.

=== San Francisco Renaissance and the Beats ===
Kyger moved to San Francisco 1957 at the age of 22, where she met Richard Brautigan, who introduced her to City Lights Bookstore and the bohemian neighborhood of North Beach. Working in Brentano's bookstore in the City of Paris department store by day and sharing her poetry at The Place bar by night, Kyger became a part of the literary scene and she was invited to join the Sunday Meetings where she read her poems aloud.

In 1958, Kyger met Gary Snyder, whom she would marry in 1960. Snyder introduced Kyger to Philip Whalen, and they became lifelong friends, sharing the sensibilities that defined their similar poetic styles. Kyger's print debut, "Tapestry #3," appeared in Spicer's mimeographed magazine J No. 4 in 1959, and she gave her first public poetry reading on March 7, 1959, at the Beer and Wine Mission. During this period she moved to the East-West House, a communal center for those interested in Asian studies, and studied with Shunryū Suzuki Roshi at the Sokoji Temple in Japantown.

=== Japan and India ===
On January 30, 1960, Kyger left California by ship to join Snyder in Kyoto, Japan. Since Japanese customs frowned upon unmarried couples living together, they were married at the American Consulate in Kobe on February 23, three days after Kyger arrived in Japan, followed by a Zen marriage ceremony performed at Daitoku-ji in Kyoto five days later. While living in Japan, Kyger wrote poetry, studied Buddhism with Ruth Fuller Sasaki at Ryosen-an—the zendo of the First Zen Institute's Kyoto branch, learned flower arranging, taught English, and acted in small roles in Japanese B movies.

In December 1961, Kyger and Snyder traveled to India with Allen Ginsberg and Peter Orlovsky. They met with the Dalai Lama in March 1962. The following month, Kyger and Snyder continued their travels in Singapore, Vietnam, and Hong Kong.

During this period, in addition to writing poems that would be included in her first book, Kyger recorded her travels in diaries, which were published in 1981 as The Japan and India Journals 1960–1964. The autobiographical text—which chronicles, in part, her growing frustration with Snyder's expectations and Ginsberg's antics—is considered an important document of the Beat era, offering a rare female perspective on the male-centric movement. In the foreword of the 2000 reissue of the book, Anne Waldman calls it "one of the finest books ever in the genre of 'journal writing'" and "a surprisingly (surreptitiously) feminist tract as well: woman artist struggles for identity and independence in the 1960s."

=== Early successes ===
In January 1964, Kyger left Snyder to his studies in Japan and returned alone, her marriage disintegrated, to San Francisco. She met painter and student of Buddhism Jack Boyce and married him in 1965 after divorcing Snyder. The same year, she participated in the Berkeley Poetry Conference, meeting poets Charles Olson and Ted Berrigan. She edited an edition of Wild Dog magazine, and The Tapestry and the Web, her first book of poems—with drawings by Boyce—was published.

The following year, Kyger and Boyce visited Europe and settled in New York City for a year.

In 1967, Kyger received a residency at the National Center for Experiments in Television in San Francisco. Drawing on Descartes's Discourse on the Method, she translated the philosopher's work into a poem-video titled "Descartes and the Splendor of. A Real Drama of Everyday Life. In Six Parts." The video, Kyger's only one, aired in November 1968. During this period, she met Carlos Castaneda and Michael Harner and discussed the illusions of a peyote vision she had in 1959.

=== The Bolinas years ===
September

The grasses are light brown
and ocean comes in
long shimmering lines
under the fleet from last night
which dozes now in the early morning

Here and there horses graze
on somebody's acreage

Strangely, it was not my desire

that bade me speak in church to be released
but memory of the way it used to be in
careless and exotic play

when characters were promises
then recognitions. The world of transformation
is real and not real but trusting.

Enough of these lessons? I mean
didactic phrases to take you in and out of
love's mysterious bonds?

Well I myself am not myself.

and which power of survival I speak
for is not made of houses.

It is inner luxury, of golden figures
that breathe like mountains do
and whose skin is made dusky by stars

— © Joanne Kyger, From All This Every Day (1975)

At the end of the '60s, Kyger joined other poets following the back-to-the-land movement. In 1969 she settled in the small coastal town of Bolinas, California, with Jack Boyce. The community and the landscape of Bolinas would feature prominently in her work from that point on.

In 1970, she separated from Jack Boyce, and the following year, she bought a house on the Bolinas Mesa, which she shared with Peter Warshall. In 1971, she accompanied Warshall and a group of Harvard students to Puerto Rico to study a colony of rhesus monkeys, and embarked on a Carl Jung–inspired study of dreams that became Desecheo Notebook, published the same year. Kyger and Warshall also traveled to Chiapas, Mexico. Kyger's All This Every Day, was written at that time and published in 1975, the year her relationship with Warshall ended.

In the mid-70s, she began teaching occasionally at the New College of California, an activity she continued until 2001. In 1977, she also became a regular teacher in the summer writing program at the Jack Kerouac School of Disembodied Poetics at Naropa University in Boulder, Colorado. There she met Canadian-American writer, artist, and naturalist Donald Guravich, who would become her lifelong partner and collaborator. He joined her permanently in Bolinas in 1978 and they were married in 2013. They lived in Bolinas until her death in 2017.

=== Mexico ===
Beginning in the mid-80s and continuing for almost three decades, Kyger and Guravich frequently traveled to Mexico, often to Oaxaca, but also to Quintana Roo, Yucatán, Chiapas, Pátzcuaro, Michoacán and Veracruz. These trips provided inspiration for several volumes of Kyger's poetry, including Phenomenological, an edition in the series A Curriculum of the Soul that explores the nature of consciousness.

=== Later life and death ===
Kyger became the Wednesday editor of the Bolinas Hearsay News in 1984, a post she held for over 20 years. During this period, she continued teaching occasionally at Naropa University and the New College, as well as teaching at Mills College and offering writing classes in Bolinas. In 2000, her 1981 collection of autobiographical writings was reissued as Strange Big Moon: Japan and India Journals, 1960–1964. More recent poetry collections include Again: Poems 1989–2000, As Ever: Selected Poems, The Distressed Look, and God Never Dies. In 2006 she was awarded a grant from the Foundation for Contemporary Arts Grants to Artists Award. About Now: Collected Poems was published in 2007 by the National Poetry Foundation and received the 2008 PEN Oakland Josephine Miles National Literary Award for Poetry. On Time: Poems 2005–2014, one of her last book of poems, was published by City Lights in 2015. Kyger describes her work in her 2005 artist statement:

The shape of the day, the words of the moment, what's happening around me in the world of interior and exterior space—these are my writing concerns. Living in a semi-rural environment the cast of characters in my poems are often the quail, deer, raccoons, coyote bush, oaks, the ocean, the weather, and a few treasured friends. All are equally valid in the environment of place. Some talk more than others. My attention to writing is a daily practice, which then builds an accumulative narrative of chronology. Which ends up as the story of one's life. An historical sense of 'self,' breathing and experiencing what is common to every human—the local, the ordinary, the non-motivated sense of just 'being.' One is also aware of the accumulations of lineage of all those writing persons who have come before and to whom one owes the inheritance of this written moment.

Buddhism Without A Book

Joanne Kyger was a student of Zen Buddhism and an advocate for the simpler, calmer way of life it practiced. Although she often took hallucinogenic medication to achieve such a state, she only encouraged others to search for serenity of mind, body, and soul. Per definition, "Zen meditation, is a way of vigilance and self-discovery which is practiced while sitting on a meditation cushion. It is the experience of living from moment to moment, in the here and now." She embraced this lifestyle completely as shown throughout her poetry, even in her later works. In "Buddhism Without A Book," the speaker highlights how Buddhism is not just a religion but a state of being, which one can partake in even if they do not possess an instruction manual. As the speaker states, "another person passed simplicity on to you," which suggests it is a lifestyle to be shared in hopes of helping those with "fear and hate" (2-3, 11). For those who are fearful of the proper way to meditate, she calms them with the reassurance that it is "not perfect, but intimate;" therefore, one does not need to have all the right yoga positions because all one needs is his/her "mind" (6,5). She does not want to pressure people into a philosophy, but rather a release from "the futility of maintaining/ those troublesome states" (8-9). This way of life is an antidote to a world of violence, hate, and hostility. All it takes is a moment to "lift the corners of your mouth slightly/ and take three breaths" to achieve a state of calm in a world in constant turmoil (12-3).

Kyger died at age 82 on March 22, 2017 at her home in Bolinas, California from lung cancer, in the company of her husband, Donald Guravich. Kyger had been working on a new book, There You Are: Interviews, Journals, and Ephemera. It was published in September 2017 by Wave Books. She was described by the San Francisco Gate as "a leading poet of the San Francisco Renaissance and a rare female voice of the male-dominated Beat generation."

== Bibliography ==
- The Tapestry and the Web (San Francisco: Four Seasons Foundation, 1965)
- Joanne (Bolinas: Angel Hair, 1970)
- Places To Go (Los Angeles: Black Sparrow Press, 1970). Illustrations by Jack Boyce
- Desecheo Notebook (Berkeley: Arif Press, 1971)
- Trip Out and Fall Back (Berkeley: Arif Press, 1974). Illustrations by Gordon Baldwin
- Trucks: Tracks (Bolinas: MesaPress. 1974). With Franco Beltrametti; illustrations by Piero Resta
- All This Every Day (Bolinas: Big Sky, 1975) ISBN 9780929844046
- Lettre de Paris (Berkeley: Poltroon Press, 1977). With Larry Fagin
- The Wonderful Focus of You (Calais: Z Press, 1980). ISBN 9780915990221
- Mexico Blondé (Bolinas: Evergreen, 1981). Illustrations by Donald Guravich
- The Japan and India Journals 1960–1964 (Bolinas: Tombouctou, 1981). Cover illustration by Ken Botto. ISBN 9780939180011. Reissued as Strange Big Moon: The Japan and India Journals, 1960–1964 (Berkeley: North Atlantic Books, 2000). ISBN 9781556433375
- Up My Coast (Point Reyes Station: Floating Island Publications, 1981). Illustrations by Inez Storer. ISBN 9780912449050
- Going On: Selected Poems, 1958–1980 (New York: Dutton, 1983). ISBN 9780525241713 (hardcover); ISBN 9780525480556 (paperback)
- The Dharma Committee (Bolinas: Smithereens Press, 1986). Cover illustration by Donald Guravich
- Man & Women (Berkeley: Two Windows Press, 1987). With Michael Rothenberg; illustrations by Nancy Davis
- Phenomenological (Canton: Grove Publications for Institute of Further Studies Curriculum of the Soul Series, 1989). Illustrations by Donald Guravich. ISBN 9780933237896
- Just Space: Poems 1979–1989 (Santa Rosa: Black Sparrow Press, 1991). Illustrations by Arthur Okamura. ISBN 9780876858356
- Some Sketches from the Life of Helena Petrovna Blavatsky (Boulder: Rodent Press and Erudite Fangs, 1996). ISBN 9781887289221
- Pátzcuaro : December 17, 1997–January 26, 1998 (Bolinas: Blue Millennium Press, 1999). ISBN 9780963146236
- Some Life (Sausalito: Post-Apollo Press, 2000). ISBN 9780942996401
- Again: Poems 1989–2000 (Albuquerque: La Alameda Press, 2001). ISBN 9781888809251
- As Ever: Selected Poems (New York: Penguin Poets, 2002). ISBN 9780142001127
- Ten Shines (N.p.: Nijinsky Suicide Health Club, 2002). Cover illustration by Nemi Frost
- The Distressed Look (Brunswick: Coyote Books, 2004)
- God Never Dies (Santa Cruz: Blue Press, 2004)
- Detektivgeschichten der Leidenschaft (Berlin: Stadtlichter Presse, 2005). ISBN 9783936271270
- About Now: Collected Poems (Orono: National Poetry Foundation, 2007). ISBN 978-0943373720 (hardcover); ISBN 9780943373713 (paperback)
- Not Veracruz (New York: Libellum, 2007). ISBN 9780975299333
- Lo & Behold: Household and Threshold on California's North Coast (Taos: Voices from the American Land, 2009). Illustrations by Donald Guravich
- 2012 (Santa Cruz: Blue Press, 2013)
- On Time: Poems 2005–2014 (San Francisco: City Lights Books, 2015). ISBN 9780872866805
- Amsterdam Souvenirs (Santa Cruz: Blue Press, 2016). With Bill Berkson
- There You Are: Interviews, Journals, and Ephemera (Seattle: Wave Books, 2017). ISBN 9781940696584

== See also ==
- Bolinas, California
