= Fielding Dawson =

American writer

- Fielding Dawson at Black Mountain College
- Born: Guy Fielding Lewis Dawson; August 2, 1930; New York City, U.S.
- Died: January 5, 2002 (aged 71); New York City, U.S.
- Education: Black Mountain College (1949–1952)
- Occupations: Writer, novelist, short story author, poet, painter, collagist, educator
- Writing career
- Period: 1955–2002
- Genres: Stream of consciousness, memoir, fiction
- Notable works: An Emotional Memoir of Franz Kline (1967), Krazy Kat/The Unveiling & Other Stories (1969), The Black Mountain Book (1970)
- Literary movement: Beat Generation, Black Mountain poets

Fielding Dawson (August 2, 1930 – January 5, 2002, aged 71) was a Beat-era author of short stories and novels, and a student at Black Mountain College. He was also a painter and collagist whose works appeared in several books of poetry and many literary magazines.

== Biography ==
Dawson was born in New York City. As a child, his family moved to Kirkwood, Missouri. His father was a journalist. He studied portrait drawing with Tanasko Milovich. In 1949, he enrolled at Black Mountain College. With Robert Rauschenberg and Kenneth Noland, he studied painting with under Franz Kline. He also studied writing with Charles Olson.

Dawson was still writing up until his unexpected death in January 2002. He had become a teacher, first in prisons like Sing Sing, at the Jack Kerouac School of Disembodied Poetics at the Naropa Institute in Boulder, where he taught regularly, and continuing on to work with at-risk students at Upward Bound High School in Hartwick, New York.

== Work ==
Dawson was known for his stream-of-consciousness style. Much of his work was lax in punctuation to emphasize the immediacy of thought. His work has been compared to other Beat poets, including Jack Kerouac and Allen Ginsberg.

He has been called "The Best St. Louis Writer You've Never Read" by David Clewell, a professor of history at Webster University.

Porter Fox has written of Dawson, "Many of his best pieces were short, often autobiographical. Some of the greatest were just a page or two. The writing was plain-faced, without contrived plots, bookish vocabulary, or literary allusions."

Robert Creeley said of his work, "I have never seen a writer capable of such fast shifts, so instantly, nervously exact."

The Fielding Dawson Papers are housed at the library of the University of Connecticut.

== Partial bibliography ==
=== Stories ===
- Elizabeth Constantine (Biltmore Press, 1955)
- Krazy Kat and One More (The Print Workshop, 1955)
- Thread (Ferry Press, 1964)
- Krazy Kat/The Unveiling and Other Stories from 1951-1968 (Black Sparrow, 1969)
- The Dream/Thunder Road: Stories and Dreams, 1955-1965 (Black Sparrow, 1972)
- The Greatest Story Ever Told: A Transformation (Black Sparrow, 1973)
- The Sun Rises Into the Sky and Other Stories 1952-1966 (Black Sparrow, 1974)
- The Man Who Changed Overnight and Other Stories & Dreams 1970-1974 (Black Sparrow, 1976)
- Krazy Kat & 76 More: Collected Stories 1950-1976 (Black Sparrow, 1982)
- Virginia Dare: Stories 1976-1981 (Black Sparrow, 1985)
- Will She Understand? New Short Stories (Black Sparrow, 1988)
- The Trick: New Stories (Black Sparrow, 1990)
- The Orange in the Orange: A Novella & Two Stories (Black Sparrow, 1995)
- The Land of Milk & Honey: A Big Little Book: New Stories (XOXOXpress, 2001)
- The Dirty Blue Car: New Stories (XOXOXpress, 2004)

=== Novels ===
- Open Road (Black Sparrow, 1970)
- The Mandalay Dream (Bobbs-Merrill, 1971)
- A Great Day for a Ballgame (Bobbs-Merrill, 1973)
- Penny Lane (Black Sparrow, 1977)
- Two Penny Lane (Black Sparrow, 1977)
- Three Penny Lane (Black Sparrow, 1981)
- Tiger Lilies: An American Childhood (Duke University, 1984)
- No Man's Land (Times Change, 2000)

=== Other ===
- An Emotional Memoir of Franz Kline (Pantheon, 1967)
- The Black Mountain Book (E.P. Dutton, 1970) (revised, Wesleyan College Press, 1991)
