= Man in a Landscape (poetry collection) =

1960 poetry collection by Colin Thiele

- Author: Colin Thiele
- Language: English
- Genre: poetry
- Publisher: Rigby, Adelaide
- Publication date: 1960
- Publication place: Australia
- Media type: Print
- Pages: 55pp
- Preceded by: The Golden Lightning : Poems
- Followed by: Beginners Please : one-act plays for schools

Man in a Landscape (1960) is the third poetry collection by Australian author and poet Colin Thiele. It won the Grace Leven Prize for Poetry in 1960.

The collection consists of 5 sequences of poems, with several others interspersed between the sequences.

== Contents ==
- Man in a Landscape sequence
  - "Bert Schultz"
  - "Eclipse"
  - "Tree at the Tin-Hut Camp"
  - "Tom Farley"
  - "The Mushroomer"
  - "Portrait from Yardea"
  - "Bird in the Classroom"
  - "Swan and Roland Robinson"
  - "Fisherman, Moonlight Bay"
  - "Below Goolwa"
  - "Murray Mouth"
  - "Spear-Fisherboy"
- "Saturday Evening"
- Adelaide Arias sequence
  - "Sturt Creek"
  - "City Noise"
  - "Evening Silhouette"
  - "Suburban Segregation"
  - "City Accident"
  - "Love on the Lawns"
  - "Unknown Funeral"
  - "Fashions about Town"
  - "Public Holiday, Botanic Park"
  - "To Roost"
- "Bert Wilson's Daughter"
- Of Few Days sequence
  - "Massacre at Waterloo Bay"
  - "The Trilobite"
  - "'Today a Skeleton Was Unearthed ...'"
  - "Thoughts on An Unknown Funeral"
  - "Lines Written on My Father's Funeral"
  - "The Ruin"
  - "Country Schoolboy"
  - "Mis-Shapen Yacca, Adelaide Hills"
- "Pacific Crossing"
- North American Diary sequence
  - "Evening Storm in the Pacific"
  - "North American Winter"
  - "Mountain Funeral"
  - "Babel"
  - "South-Sea Kaleidoscope"
- Light of Heart sequence
  - "Thanksgiving for Water"
  - "Spring Rain"
  - "The Carob Tree"
  - "September Morning"
  - "Princes Highway, with Showers"
  - "The Magpie"
  - "Kapunda Morning"

== Critical reception ==
In his review of the poetry collection in Westerly Malcolm Leven wrote: "Mr. Thiele's poems do not rock our ears with motion or swamp our eyes with light, nor do they, at a different level, strike up a hallucinatory ringing in the conceptual spheres. Thus the fascination of image cadenzas and concept improvisations seems to be unavailable to the turgid, thick-rimmed cells of his poetic imagination, and the poems seem more a parasol of violent verbs lowered over a vague and struggling sense of a situation instinct with movement and life." He then went on to allow a little praise for the author when stating that some poems, "especially 'Bert Schultz', are the clearest expressions in the book of Mr. Thiele's attitude towards his poetry and its subjects — Australia and the Aussie. He feels part of the continent, moulded by its contours, sustained by its rugged power. He loves it in his bones. It is when he says this, indirectly but without evasion, that he succeeds."

== Awards ==
- 1960 - winner Grace Leven Prize for Poetry

== See also ==
- 1960 in poetry
