= Karenne Wood =

American poet

- Born: 1960; Fluvanna County, Virginia, US
- Died: 2019 (aged 59)
- Occupations: Native American anthropologist and historian

Karenne Wood (born 1960, died 21 July 2019) was a member of the Monacan Indian tribe who was known for her poetry and for her work in tribal history. She served as the director of the Virginia Indian Programs at Virginia Humanities, in Charlottesville, Virginia, U.S. She directed a tribal history project for the Monacan Nation, conducted research at the National Museum of the American Indian, and served on the National Congress of American Indians' Repatriation Commission. In 2015, she was named one of the Library of Virginia's "Virginia Women in History".

== Biography ==
Karenne Wood was born in 1960, grew up in the Washington, DC metropolitan area and is an enrolled member of the Monacan Indian Nation. She earned a Master's of Fine Arts from George Mason University and a PhD in anthropology at the University of Virginia.

Wood worked as a researcher at the National Museum of the American Indian and was tribal historian for the Monacan Nation for six years. In the mid-2000s, Wood served as the Repatriation Coordinator for the Association on American Indian Affairs (AAIA), supervising the return to Native communities of sacred objects. She has served on the National Congress of American Indians’ Repatriation Commission and on the Monacan Tribal Council.

Wood held a gubernatorial appointment as Chair of the Virginia Council on Indians for four years, and served on the Advisory Council for the 'Jamestown 400th Commemoration Commission' during the 2007 quadrennial celebration of Virginia. As part of the preparations, Wood edited The Virginia Indian Heritage Trail (2007) and curated the exhibition Beyond Jamestown: Virginia Indians Past and Present, at the Virginia Museum of Natural History.

In 2008, she was named director of the Virginia Indian Heritage Program (later Virginia Indian Programs) at Virginia Humanities, a state humanities council in Charlottesville, Virginia.

Wood was a published poet and studied the Monacan language, which is no longer spoken. She was evaluating the linguistic heritage of her tribe and the effects of loss of language upon people. Her areas of study included how one communicates with elders and ancestors when the words they used no longer exist, and how that changes the values of people.

== Selected works ==
- "Urban Nightmare," American Indian Quarterly, Vol. 22, No. 4 (1998), p 493
- The Monacan Indians: Our Story (1999)
- Weaving the boundary: [poems] (March 2016) University of Arizona Press, Sun Tracks series.
- Wood, Karenne (2001). Markings on earth. First book awards. Tucson: University of Arizona Press. ISBN 0816521654.
- Wood, Karenne (2007)The Virginia Indian Heritage Trail, 2nd ed. Charlottesville, VA: Virginia Foundation for the Humanities.

In Anthology

- Ghost Fishing: An Eco-Justice Poetry Anthology (2018) University of Georgia Press.
