= Pierre Trottier =

Canadian novelist

Pierre Trottier (March 21, 1925 – April 9, 2010) was a Canadian novelist. He won the Prix David in 1960. He was born in Montreal, Quebec and died in the same city.

== Awards ==
- David Price for the Sleeping Beauties 1960
- Price of the society of men of letters to The Return of Oedipus in 1964.
- Member of the Royal Society of Canada since 1978 and the Union of writers and writers Quebec
