= Ray Bremser =

American poet

Photograph of Bremser by Allen Ginsberg (1987)

Ray Bremser (February 22, 1934 – November 3, 1998) was an American poet married to Brenda Bremser (née Brenda Frazer).

Bremser was born in Jersey City, New Jersey. When he was 17 he went AWOL from the United States Air Force and was briefly imprisoned. The next year he was sent to Bordentown Reformatory for 6 years for armed robbery. He began writing poetry there and sent copies to Allen Ginsberg, Gregory Corso and Amiri Baraka (then LeRoi Jones), who published his poems in the poetry magazine, Yūgen.

In 1959, Ray met and married Brenda "Bonnie" Frazer, later a soil scientist and writer. In 1969, her memoir Troia: Mexican Memoirs was published in US from her prison letters to Ray, detailing her 1960s life on the road as a prostitute in Mexico, to support him and their child, Rachel, while Ray was on the lam or behind bars. Ronna Johnson's entry in BookForum writes: "After dropping out of Sweet Briar College in Virginia, Bonnie met and married the Beat poet Ray Bremser in 1959, having known him for three weeks. Two years later, they were on the lam in Mexico with their baby, Rachel, fugitives from the New Jersey prison authorities, which were pursuing Ray for violating parole. This flight, the manifest subject of Troia, is recounted in the daily two-page letters Bonnie Bremser wrote to Ray from March to November 1963, during his second incarceration. She retrospectively details her life of prostitution on the road in Mexico and the couple’s desperate relinquishment of Rachel there."

Ray Bremser read poetry in The Gaslight Cafe in the Greenwich Village neighborhood. He had five books of his poetry published and was featured in the 1987 film The Beat Generation: An American Dream.

On November 3, 1998, Ray Bremser died of lung cancer in Faxton Hospital, Utica.

== Bibliography ==
- Poems of Madness (1965), Paper Book Gallery
- Angel (1967), Tompkins Square Press
- Drive Suite (1968), Nova Broadcast Press
- Black Is Black Blues (1971), Intrepid Press
- Blowing Mouth: The Jazz Poems, 1938-1970 (1978), Cherry Valley Editions
- The Conquerors (1998), Water Row Press
