= Man in a Landscape (TV series) =

- Genre: Documentary
- Country of origin: Canada
- Original language: English
- No. of seasons: 1
- No. of episodes: 10

Production
- Running time: 30 minutes

Original release
- Network: CBC Television
- Release: 17 July – 18 September 1963

Man in a Landscape is a Canadian cultural documentary television series that aired on CBC Television in 1963.

== Premise ==
This series featured various programs ostensibly relating to the arts.

== Scheduling ==
This half-hour series aired on Wednesdays at 10:30 p.m. (Eastern) from 17 July to 18 September 1963.

A feature based on Lister Sinclair's poem on Beethoven was planned as the series debut, but was unexpectedly pre-empted. This episode aired later, outside the series regular time slot, on 14 September 1963. It featured Douglas Rain portraying Beethoven and Frank Perry portraying other characters. James Murray produced this programme.

== Episodes ==
- "Chopin's Life in Paris", a two-part biography (Ronald Hambleton producer), broadcast 17 and 24 July 1963
- "Wall and Window", a two-part documentary on architecture, hosted by University of Toronto professor James Acland, which was broadcast 31 July and 7 August 1963
- A six-part series on travel history hosted by Anna Camerson (Leo Rampen producer), broadcast 14 August to 18 September 1963
