= Donald Allen =

American editor, publisher and translator (1912–2004)

Donald Merriam Allen
- Born: March 26, 1912; Muscatine, Iowa, U.S.
- Died: August 29, 2004 (aged 92); San Francisco, California, U.S.
- Education: University of Iowa (BA and MA), postgraduate studies at UC Berkeley
- Occupations: Literary editor and publisher
- Known for: Editing The New American Poetry 1945-1960

Donald Merriam Allen (Muscatine, Iowa, March 26, 1912 – San Francisco, California, August 29, 2004) was an American editor, publisher and translator of literary works. He is best known for editing the popular anthology of post-WWII avant-garde American poems, The New American Poetry 1945-1960.

== Early life ==
Allen was born in Iowa in 1912, the son of a doctor. He graduated from the University of Iowa in 1934, and stayed there to earn his M.A. in English literature the following year. During World War II, he served in the U.S. Navy. He was involved in some combat, earning a Purple Heart and Bronze Star, but also used his facility for languages to work as a Japanese translator. After leaving military service, he pursued postgraduate studies at University of California Berkeley until 1949. He then accepted a job in New York City as editor of Grove Press, a position he would hold until 1970.

== Career ==
Allen was one of the first U.S. translators of the Romanian-French Absurdist playwright Eugène Ionesco. Allen's 1958 volume, Four Plays of Eugène Ionesco, helped introduce the playwright to American audiences.

Allen became acquainted with numerous American poets and novelists, some of whose work he edited. He is mentioned directly in Frank O'Hara's "Personal Poem" (from the 1964 collection Lunch Poems, a book that Allen co-edited). O'Hara writes, in reference to a conversation he had with LeRoi Jones, "we don't like Lionel Trilling / we decide, we like Don Allen." Allen would go on to edit O'Hara's Collected Poems (1971) and Selected Poems (1974) as well as works by poet Lew Welch. Novelist John Rechy records in his memoirs that it was Allen who offered him the contract to publish City of Night (1963).

Prior to 1960, Allen occasionally wrote poetry himself, but largely gave up the practice to focus on finding and publishing other writers. In 1960, he moved from New York to San Francisco, where he established Grey Fox Press and the Four Seasons Foundation, two literary presses that published works by Beat Generation, San Francisco Renaissance, Black Mountain, and New York School writers. As CEO of Grey Fox Press, he published writings by Jack Spicer, along with Enough Said (1980) by Philip Whalen, and I Remain (1980), a collection of Welch's letters. Other authors published by Grey Fox Press included Richard Brautigan, Robert Duncan, Jack Kerouac, Joanne Kyger, Philip Lamantia, Charles Olson, John Rechy, Michael Rumaker, Aaron Shurin, and Gary Snyder.

In 1960, Allen edited the groundbreaking anthology The New American Poetry 1945-1960, released through Grove Press. It introduced over 40 avant-garde poets to American readers. In addition to presenting more than 200 poems, the anthology included a section titled "Statements on Poetics", which offered a discussion of experimental aesthetics from the likes of Lawrence Ferlinghetti, Philip Whalen, Gary Snyder, Michael McClure, LeRoi Jones, John Wieners, Jack Kerouac and Allen Ginsberg. When the anthology was reissued by University of California Press in 1999, the publisher stated that more than 100,000 copies had been sold. In a blurb for the 1999 reissue, Jerome Rothenberg wrote:

Donald Allen's prophetic anthology had an electrifying effect on two generations, at least, of American poets and readers. More than the repetition of familiar names and ideas that most anthologies seem to be about, here was the declaration of a collective, intelligent, and thoroughly visionary work-in-progress: the primary example for its time of the anthology-as-manifesto. Its republication today—complete with poems, statements on poetics, and autobiographical projections—provides us, again, with a model of how a contemporary anthology can and should be shaped.

While working with the Four Seasons Foundation, Allen assisted in the publication of (among others): Interviews (1980) by Edward Dorn, A Quick Graph: Collected Notes and Essays (1970) by Robert Creeley, and The Graces (1983) by Aaron Shurin. In 1997, Allen helped edit, along with Benjamin Friedlander, the Collected Prose of Charles Olson (University of California Press).

=== Grey Fox Press ===
Grey Fox Press and Four Seasons Foundation were among the many emerging presses that City Lights distributed in the late 1960s, and when Don Allen began thinking about retirement, City Lights offered to acquire the backlists. City Lights went on to publish significant works from those presses in their City Lights/Grey Fox series.

The Donald Allen Collection, processed in 1991 for a special collection series at the UC San Diego library, contains materials that Allen published through the Four Seasons Foundation and Grey Fox Press. The papers document his editing and publishing efforts, primarily dating from 1957 to 1975, but also with material going as far back as the 1930s.

== Death ==
Donald Allen died of pneumonia in San Francisco on August 29, 2004. He was 92.
