= The New American Poetry 1945–1960 =

Poetry anthology edited by Donald Allen

- First edition
- Editor: Donald Allen
- Language: English
- Genre: poetry anthology
- Publisher: Grove Press
- Publication date: May 29, 1960
- Publication place: United States
- Pages: 454

The New American Poetry 1945–1960 is a poetry anthology edited by Donald Allen and published in 1960. It aimed to highlight a "third generation" of American poets, and included numerous works culled from the little magazines of the 1950s.

As "one of the first countercultural collections of American verse", the book enjoyed robust sales for a poetry anthology. When it was reissued in 1999, the publisher stated that more than 100,000 copies had been sold.

== Description ==
Donald Allen began work on the anthology in 1958. He aimed to showcase the range of avant-garde American poetry appearing in small magazines, independent presses, pamphlets and poetry readings since the Second World War. The project took him two years to complete and required extensive correspondence with poets, editors, and literary agents. When the book was published in 1960, it contained 215 poems by 44 poets. It also contained a Preface by Allen, a "Statement on Poetics" by 15 of the poets, Biographical Notes, and a Short Bibliography of each contributor.

Allen's key editorial decisions were which poets and poems to choose, and how to present the work. To give the anthology a structure, he organized the 44 poets into five groupings, while admitting that his divisions "were somewhat arbitrary and cannot be taken as rigid categories":

1. Black Mountain poets associated with Black Mountain College and/or the magazines Black Mountain Review and Origin, e.g., Charles Olson, Robert Duncan, Denise Levertov, Paul Blackburn, Robert Creeley, and Edward Dorn.
2. San Francisco Renaissance poets who became known mainly through Bay Area poetry readings, e.g., Helen Adam, Brother Antoninus, James Broughton, Madeline Gleason, Lawrence Ferlinghetti, Robin Blaser, Jack Spicer, and Philip Lamantia.
3. Beat Generation poets initially based in New York, although they later attracted attention in San Francisco, e.g., Jack Kerouac, Allen Ginsberg, Gregory Corso, and Peter Orlovsky.
4. New York poets, many of whom worked with the Living Theatre and Artists' Theatre, e.g., Barbara Guest, James Schuyler, Edward Field, Kenneth Koch, Frank O'Hara, and John Ashbery.
5. Younger poets not associated with a specific geography but "who have evolved their own original styles and new conceptions of poetry", e.g., Philip Whalen, Gary Snyder, Michael McClure, LeRoi Jones, Ron Loewinsohn, and David Meltzer.

Within each group, the poets were sorted chronologically by birth year, and their poems sorted by year of composition. Allen acknowledged that his groups were "more historical than actual" and "can be justified finally only as a means to give the reader some sense of milieu". A 2013 retrospective volume, The New American Poetry: Fifty Years Later, asserted that Allen "was the first to categorize these poets by the schools (Black Mountain, New York School, San Francisco Renaissance, and the Beats) by which they are known today."

The book's principal value was to provide "a forum for the many experimental poets working in the United States". Allen introduced readers to poets like Denise Levertov, Robert Creeley, John Ashbery, and Gary Snyder, and helped establish a "postmodern canon". Allen boldly claimed in the Preface that "one common characteristic" of the poetry he selected was "a total rejection of all those qualities typical of academic verse". The anthology's first poem, "The Kingfishers" by Charles Olson, opens with the lines, "What does not change / is the will to change", which signaled to readers that The New American Poetry was prepared to break with tradition. As an indicator of the pioneering nature of Allen's collection, it was published only three years after the popular anthology New Poets of England and America and yet did not include a single American poet in common with the earlier volume.

In Allen's view, the poets he spotlighted were "our avant-garde, the true continuers of the modern movement in American poetry", and "inheritors of the innovations set in motion by Ezra Pound and William Carlos Williams." Robert Lowell characterized the difference between America's older traditional poets and the poets featured in The New American Poetry as the difference between the "cooked" and the "raw".

Following the anthology's success, Allen planned to publish a revised edition every few years; however, he only produced two such books: New American Writing (Penguin, 1965) and The Postmoderns (Grove, 1965). In 1974, he co-edited with Warren Tallman a companion volume to The New American Poetry titled Poetics of the New American Poetry.

== Reception ==
Critics who aligned with the poetry establishment were harsh in their appraisals of The New American Poetry. Cecil Hemley stated in The Hudson Review that the anthology is "a very eccentric version of what has been going on. It represents Mr. Allen's private view, and that is all, and it shows what happens when a narrow, dictatorial taste attempts to assert itself as authoritative. But if one overlooks the pretentious name and the confused preface with its outrageous claims, then one can examine the poetry with a little more dispassion. There are a number of good poems in the book, and it is unfair to damn all the contributors because of Mr. Allen's over-enthusiasm." John Simon was more acerbic, dismissing the "pseudo-poets" in the anthology as lacking in seriousness and artistic merit:

[A]s for the majority of Mr. Allen's poets, they are kids who took up poetry the way one takes up marijuana, Buddhism, switchblade knives, wife-swapping, or riding in boxcars: neither more nor less seriously than other "kicks". As poets they are neither born nor made, except possibly by one another. Happily, however, they are no threat to poetry.

Harvey Shapiro wrote one of the first favorable reviews of the book. Titled "Rebellious Mythmakers", it appeared in The New York Times Book Review in August 1960.

== Influence ==
Over the decades, The New American Poetry has grown in stature and reputation. Poetry scholar Marjorie Perloff labeled the book "the fountainhead of radical American poetics" and added that "many now-classic poems first became known through Don Allen's anthology". Charles Bernstein said the anthology enabled Americans to "perceive a tradition that was different from the poetry of the 1940s and 1950s put forth by the American Academy in general, and by the New Critics in particular. The effect of this anthology has been staggering, and has helped to shape poetry since its publication." Ron Silliman called it "unquestionably the most influential single anthology of the last century. It's a great book, an epoch-making one in many ways."

The New American Poetry was also influential in Canada where "it affected the writing of at least one generation of Canadian poets". It was said to have persuaded many Canadian poets to turn away from British influences and toward American models.

Because Allen's search for new poetic voices often involved hunting through "fugitive pamphlets and little magazines", he brought newfound interest in America's non-mainstream publishers, some operating with just a mimeograph machine. Authors Steven Clay and Rodney Phillips said that Allen's book "might well be considered the 'flash point' for the renaissance in literary writing and small press publishing that would flourish within a few short years of its publication", and that "there was no more significant poetry anthology in the second half of the twentieth century".
