= Robin Blaser =

Canadian poet (1925–2009)

- Robin Blaser
- Born: Robin Francis Blaser; May 18, 1925; Denver, Colorado, United States
- Died: May 7, 2009 (aged 83); Vancouver, British Columbia, Canada
- Citizenship: American, Canadian
- Education: Simon Fraser University
- Occupations: Playwright, poet, translator
- Writing career
- Period: 1964–2008
- Notable awards: Lifetime Recognition Award – Griffin Trust for Excellence in Poetry; 2006; Griffin Poetry Prize; 2008
- Movement: San Francisco Renaissance

Robin Francis Blaser (May 18, 1925 – May 7, 2009) was an American-born Canadian playwright, poet, and translator.

== Personal background ==
Born in Denver, Colorado, Blaser grew up in Idaho, and came to Berkeley, California, in 1944. There he met Jack Spicer and Robert Duncan, becoming a key figure in the San Francisco Renaissance of the 1950s and early 1960s. He moved to Canada in 1966, joining the faculty of Simon Fraser University; after taking early retirement in the 1980s, he held the position of professor emeritus. He lived in the Kitsilano neighborhood of Vancouver, British Columbia.

In June 1995, for Blaser's 70th birthday, a conference was held in Vancouver to pay tribute to his contribution to Canadian poetry. The conference, known as the "Recovery of the Public World" (a phrase borrowed from Hannah Arendt), was attended by poets from around the world, including Canadian poets Michael Ondaatje, Steve McCaffery, Phyllis Webb, George Bowering, Fred Wah, Stan Persky and Daphne Marlatt; and poets who reside in the United States, including Michael Palmer and Norma Cole (who was born in Canada, subsequently migrating to San Francisco).

Blaser was also well known as the editor of The Collected Books of Jack Spicer, which includes Blaser's essay, The Practice of Outside. The 1993 publication The Holy Forest represents his collected poems to that date.

In 2006, Blaser received a special Lifetime Recognition Award given by the trustees of the Griffin Trust for Excellence in Poetry, which also awards the annual Griffin Poetry Prize. Blaser won the Prize itself in 2008.

== Bibliography ==
=== Poetry ===
- The Moth Poem (White Rabbit Press, 1964)
- Les Chimères: Translations of Nerval for Fran Herndon (Open Space, 1969)
- Cups (Four Seasons Foundation, 1968)
- Image Nations 1-12 & The Stadium of the Mirror (Ferry Press, 1974)
- Image Nations 13 & 14, Luck Unluck Oneluck, Sky-stone, Suddenly, Gathering (Cobblestone Press, 1975)
- Harp Trees (Sun Stone House & Cobblestoen Press 1977)
- Image Nation 15: The Lacquerhouse (W. Hoffer, 1981)
- Syntax (Talonbooks, 1983)
- The Faerie Queene and The Park (Fissure Books, 1987)
- Pell Mell (Coach House, 1988)
- The Holy Forest, edited Stan Persky & Michael Ondaatje (Coach House, 1993)
- Nomad (Slug Press, 1995)
- Wanders, with Meredith Quartermain (Nomados, 2002)
- The Holy Forest: Collected Poems of Robin Blaser, revised and expanded edition, edited Miriam Nichols (University of California Press, 2007). ISBN 0-520-24593-8 (winner of the 2008 Canadian Griffin Poetry Prize)

=== Essays ===
- The Fire, 1967
- The Stadium of the Mirror, 1974
- The Practice of Outside, 1975
- The Violets: Charles Olson and Alfred North Whitehead, 1983
- My Vocabulary Did This To Me [on Jack Spicer], 1987
- Poetry and Positivisms, 1989
- The Elf of It [on Robert Duncan], 1992
- The Recovery of the Public World and Among Afterthoughts on This Occasion, 1993
- Here Lies the Woodpecker Who Was Zeus [on Mary Butts], 1995
- Bach's Belief (Institute of Further Studies, 1995)
- Thinking about Irreparables, a talk (Raddle Moon, 2000)
- The Fire: Collected Essays of Robin Blaser, edited Miriam Nichols (University of California Press, 2006)
- The Astonishment Tapes: Talks on Poetry and Autobiography, ed. Miriam Nichols (University of Alabama Press, 2015).

=== Opera libretto ===
- The Last Supper, the libretto for Harrison Birtwistle's opera (2000)
