= San Francisco Renaissance =

1947-1960s cultural events related to the Beats and Hippie movements

- Part of the Beat Generation and the hippie movement
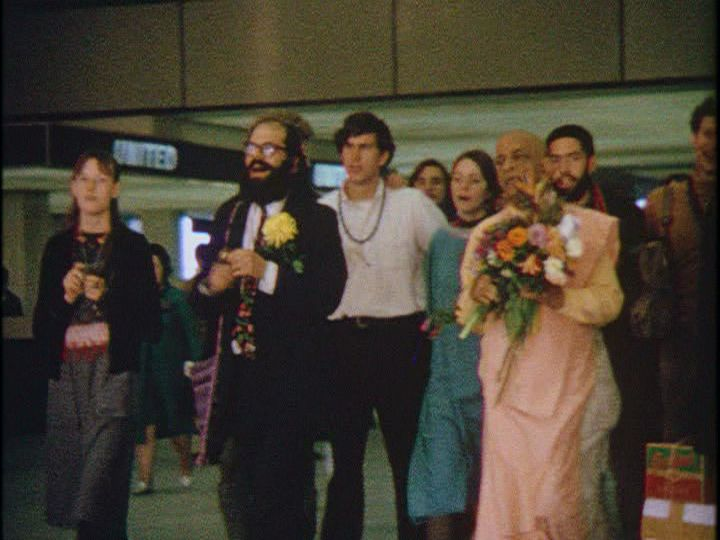
- American poet Allen Ginsberg and Indian spiritual teacher A. C. Bhaktivedanta Swami Prabhupada in San Francisco (1967)
- Date: 1950s–1960s
- Location: San Francisco, United States
- Participants: Beat writers

The term San Francisco Renaissance is used as a global designation for a range of poetic activity centered on San Francisco, which brought it to prominence as a hub of the American poetry avant-garde in the 1950s. However, others (e.g., Alan Watts, Ralph J. Gleason) felt this renaissance was a broader phenomenon and should be seen as also encompassing the visual and performing arts, philosophy, cross-cultural interests (particularly those that involved Asian cultures), and new social sensibilities.

== Founding ==
Kenneth Rexroth—poet, translator, critic, and author—is the founding father of the renaissance. Rexroth was a prominent second generation modernist poet who corresponded with Ezra Pound and William Carlos Williams and was published in the Objectivist Anthology. He was amongst the first American poets to explore Japanese poetry traditions such as haiku and was also heavily influenced by jazz. If Rexroth was the founding father, Madeline Gleason was the founding mother. During the 1940s, both she and Rexroth befriended a group of younger Berkeley poets consisting of Robert Duncan, and William Everson; Jack Spicer and Robin Blaser became involved in the late 40s. Gleason and Duncan were particularly close and read and criticized each other's work.

== Movement ==
In April 1947, Gleason organized the First Festival of Modern Poetry at Marcelle Labaudt's Lucien Labaudt Gallery, 1407 Gough Street, San Francisco. Over the space of two evenings, she brought twelve poets, including Rexroth, Robert Duncan and Spicer, to an audience of young poets and poetry lovers. This was the first public recognition of the range of experimental poetic practice that was current in the city.

During the 1950s, Duncan and Robert Creeley both taught at Black Mountain College and acted as links between the San Francisco poets and the Black Mountain poets. Many of the San Francisco writers began to publish in Cid Corman's Origin and in the Black Mountain Review, the house journals of the Black Mountain group. Spicer's interest in the cante jondo also led to links with the deep image poets. In 1957, Spicer ran his seminar "Poetry as Magic" at San Francisco State College with Duncan as a participant.

=== Impact of New American Poetry ===
Perhaps the crucial cultural document here was (and is) Donald Allen's anthology The New American Poetry 1945–1960. In this assemblage, Allen grouped some of the poets as "San Francisco Renaissance", and as Marjorie Perloff observes:

Duncan emerg(ed) as the leading poet of this group even as he also belongs to Black Mountain. These poets, who largely became known through oral performance in the Bay Area, include the following thirteen: Brother Antoninus (William Everson), Robin Blaser, Jack Spicer, James Broughton, Madeline Gleason, Helen Adam, Lawrence Ferlinghetti, Bruce Boyd, Kirby Doyle, Richard Duerden, Philip Lamantia, Ebbe Borregaard, and Lew Welch.

The Allen anthology was central to defining both the poetics and broader cultural dynamics of a particular historical moment now referred to as the San Francisco Renaissance. Though a particular "generation" had now been named (in large part because of the Allen anthology), today the debate continues as to the viability or use of the term San Francisco Renaissance as a "label" to define an entire era or generation.

Those who believe the term is accurate will argue on the one hand that indeed a "group" did forge a "renaissance": the impact on our historical consciousness was (and is) measurable. Therefore, for them, the use of the term is still verifiable. On the other hand, there are those who argue that the label San Francisco Renaissance is just that: a label. As a label, therefore, it exists as a convenient and arbitrary "grouping" of something which remains (and even must remain) "unverifiable". Since the impact of such a broad phenomenon on our consciousness cannot be measured, such an impact has not even been recognized or articulated yet, much less addressed as problematic in itself.

Beyond defining itself as itself (For example, defining some measurable impact on consciousness or on ourselves as human beings), critics of the term San Francisco Renaissance argue that beyond that particular use as a label (even if it helps to signal the arrival of a "new" phenomenon not accounted for on our consciousness), a word itself, as such, cannot act for us as an organizing principle. In other words, we are misguided if we do not recognize how this label fails us (beyond a certain usefulness as a label or "grouping") when it comes to truly measuring (much less accounting for) the impact of multiple, broad and dynamic social, political, and artistic changes in our consciousness.

Among those critical of terminology and among those who dare to question how and why it can impact consciousness, asking what that proposes for a definition of the human, perhaps Ron Silliman has been most articulate:

... San Francisco Renaissance is a grouping that I've argued before was largely a fiction created by Allen's need to organize his materials

== Beat generation ==
Around the same time that Duncan, Spicer and Blaser were at Berkeley, Gary Snyder, Philip Whalen and Lew Welch were attending Reed College in Portland, Oregon. All three stemmed initially from Rexroth and his curriculum and in the early 50s gravitated to the San Francisco area, where Spicer exercised an influence over Whalen and Welch. Although later associated by outsiders and publicists with the Beats, their primary sources are West Coast. Kirby Doyle, a native San Franciscan, and Bob Kaufman, originally from New Orleans, were with more reason associated in later accounts with the Beats.

Lawrence Ferlinghetti had been studying for a doctorate at the Sorbonne and, while in Paris, met Kenneth Rexroth, who later persuaded him to go to San Francisco to experience the growing literary scene there. Between 1951 and 1953, Ferlinghetti taught French, wrote literary criticism, and painted. In 1953, he and a business partner established the City Lights Bookstore and started publishing as City Lights Press two years later.

Snyder and Whalen, along with Michael McClure, were among the poets who performed at the famous Six Gallery poetry reading that Kenneth Rexroth organized in San Francisco on October 7, 1955. This reading signaled the full emergence of the San Francisco Renaissance into the public consciousness and helped establish the city's reputation as a center for countercultural activity that came to full flower during the hippie years of the 1960s. A short fictional account of this event forms the second chapter of Jack Kerouac's 1958 novel The Dharma Bums. In the account, he describes Allen Ginsberg's famous reading of his poem "Howl". Kerouac and Ginsberg had attended the reading with some of their poet friends.

== Legacy ==
The Bay Area-based philosopher and writer Alan Watts, in his autobiography, mentioned that by around 1960 or so "... something else was on the way, in religion, in music, in ethics and sexuality, in our attitudes to nature, and in our whole style of life", and described characteristics of a "Clear School" of poetry on whose roll he included "Alice Meynell, Walter de la Mare, Emily Dickinson, Kenneth Rexroth, Karl Shapiro, Jean Burden, and Eric Barker (to name but a few)." Watts asserted that these poets employ traditional rhythms and "say what they have to say with an easy, natural clarity which avoids both clichés and obscure allusions or bizarre, far-fetched images."

Some of the songwriters of the upcoming rock-music generation of the mid-1960s and later, read the work of writers like Kerouac, Snyder, McClure, Ferlinghetti, and Ginsberg (e.g., Bob Dylan, for one, has talked about this). Hence, given that much of the late-'60s wave of groundbreaking rock music developed within rock's famous San Francisco Sound, it seems very likely that the writers of the San Francisco Renaissance had an influence on the lyrics, both artistically and in terms of attitudes to living.

The "underground press" that developed in America and elsewhere in the 1960s had one of its most interesting and colorful examples in the San Francisco Oracle which reflected the hippie culture and other aspects of the counterculture. The Oracle gave much space to writings by Gary Snyder, Allen Ginsberg, Lawrence Ferlinghetti, Michael McClure, and other Beat writers, along with emerging younger writers.

Both Lawrence Ferlinghetti and Michael McClure were featured on-stage in the rock-star jammed The Last Waltz, a 1978 documentary and concert film made by Martin Scorsese about The Band (who had an immense following in the late 1960s to mid 1970s), a large number of their musical friends, and the 1976 concert of the same name.

== Sources ==
=== Print ===
- Allen, Donald M., ed. The New American Poetry: 1945-1960 (1960, reissued 1999); (University of California Press).
- Ellingham, Lewis & Killian, Kevin. Poet Be Like God: Jack Spicer and the San Francisco Renaissance, (Hanover, NH: Wesleyan University Press, 1998).
- French, Warren G. "The San Francisco Poetry Renaissance 1955-1960" (Twayne, 1991). ISBN 0-8057-7621-4
- Davidson, Michael. The San Francisco Renaissance: Poetics and Community at Mid-Century, (Cambridge: Cambridge University Press, 1989).
- Kerouac, Jack The Dharma Bums, (New York: Harcourt Brace, 1958). ISBN 0-14-004252-0
- Snyder, Gary The Real Work: Interviews & Talks 1964-1979. (New York: New Directions, 1980). ISBN 0-8112-0761-7
- Spicer, Jack The Collected Books of Jack Spicer. Edited and with commentary by Robin Blaser. (Santa Rosa, Calif.: Black Sparrow Press, 1975).
- Watts, Alan W. "Breakthrough" (chapter) in In My Own Way, (New York: Pantheon, 1972). ISBN 978-0-394-46911-9
- Wagstaff, Christopher (ed). Madeline Gleason: Collected Poems 1919–1979 (has a very useful historical introduction)

=== Recordings and sound-files ===
- Howls, Raps & Roars: Recordings from the San Francisco poetry renaissance (compilation) (Universal Music Group, 1963; Fantasy Records 1993).
