= Charles Olson =

American poet (1910–1970)

- Born: 27 December 1910; Worcester, Massachusetts, U.S.
- Died: 10 January 1970 (aged 59); New York City, U.S.
- Resting place: Gloucester, Massachusetts
- Education: Wesleyan University B.A., 1932; M.A., 1933; Harvard University Graduate work in American Studies, 1936-1939
- Spouse(s): Constance (Connie) Wilcock; Elizabeth (Betty) Kaiser
- Children: 2
- Writing career
- Genre: Poetry
- Notable works: The Distances, The Maximus Poems
- Movement: Postmodernism

Charles John Olson (27 December 1910 – 10 January 1970) was a second generation modernist American poet who was a link between earlier modernist figures such as Ezra Pound and William Carlos Williams and the third generation modernist New American poets. The latter includes the New York School, the Black Mountain School, and some of the artists and poets associated with the Beat Generation and the San Francisco Renaissance.

Today, Olson remains a central figure of the Black Mountain Poetry school and is generally considered a key figure in moving American poetry from modernism to postmodernism. In these endeavors, Olson described himself not so much as a poet or a historian but as "an archeologist of morning." (Note: In the preceding citation, Elyssa East quotes Olson: “The trouble is,” Olson admitted at the end of Mayan Letters, “it is very difficult, to be both a poet and, an historian.” But the expression “archaeologist of morning” freed Olson not just from the constraints of the terms “poet” and “writer” but also those of “historian,” while the profession of archaeology helped him find both a technique and a model for bringing his poetic fieldwork to the page.)

== Life ==
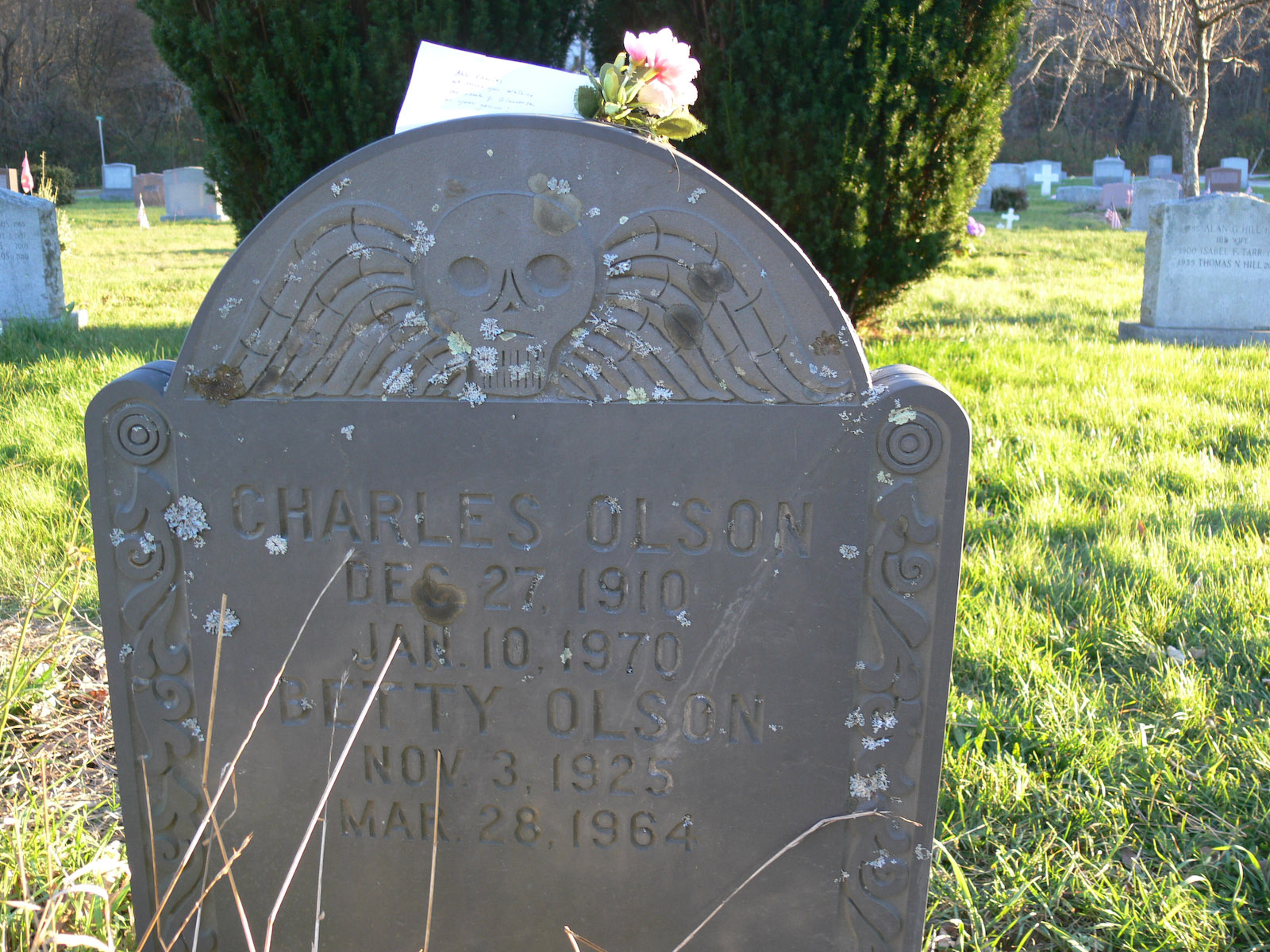
Gravestone of Charles and Betty Olson, Beechbrook Cemetery, Gloucester, Massachusetts

Olson was born to Karl Joseph and Mary (Hines) Olson and grew up in Worcester, Massachusetts, where his father worked as a mail carrier. He spent summers in Gloucester, Massachusetts, which was to become his adopted hometown and the focus of his writing. In high school, he was a champion orator, winning a tour of Europe (including a meeting with William Butler Yeats) as a prize. He studied English literature at Wesleyan University, where he graduated Phi Beta Kappa in 1932 before earning an M.A. in the discipline (with a thesis on the oeuvre of Herman Melville) in 1933. After completing his M.A., Olson continued his Melville research at Wesleyan during the 1933–1934 academic year with partial fellowship support. For two years thereafter, he taught English as an instructor at Clark University in Worcester, Massachusetts.

Olson entered Harvard University as a doctoral student in English in 1936. He eventually joined the newly-formed doctoral program in American Civilization as one of its first three candidates. Throughout his studies, he worked at Winthrop House and Radcliffe College as an instructor and tutor in English. Although he completed his coursework by the spring of 1939, he failed to finish his dissertation and take the degree. He then received the first of two Guggenheim Fellowships for his studies of Melville; a monograph derived from his master's thesis and subsequent research, Call Me Ishmael, was published in 1947. His first poems were written in 1940.

In 1941, Olson moved to New York City's Greenwich Village and began living with Constance "Connie" Wilcock in a common-law marriage; they had one child, Katherine. During this period, he was employed as the publicity director for the American Civil Liberties Union (May 1941 – July 1941) and as chief of the Common Council for American Unity's Foreign Language Information Service (November 1941 – September 1942). At that point, they moved to Washington, D.C., where he worked in the Foreign Language Division of the Office of War Information, eventually rising to associate chief under Alan Cranston.

Upset about the increasing censorship of his news releases, Olson went to work for the Democratic National Committee as director of the Foreign Nationalities Division in May 1944. In this capacity, he participated in Franklin Roosevelt's 1944 presidential campaign, organizing "Everyone for Roosevelt", a large campaign rally at New York's Madison Square Garden. Following Roosevelt's re-election to an unprecedented fourth term, he wintered in Key West, Florida. In January 1945, he was offered his choice of two positions (including Assistant Secretary of the Treasury and the Cabinet-rank Postmaster General) in the Roosevelt administration. Increasingly disenchanted with politics, he turned down both posts.

The death of Roosevelt and concomitant ascendancy of Harry Truman in April 1945 inspired Olson to dedicate himself to a literary career. From 1946 to 1948, Olson visited Ezra Pound at St. Elizabeths Hospital, drawn to the poet and his work though repelled by some of his political ideas.

In September 1948, Olson became a visiting professor at Black Mountain College in North Carolina, replacing longtime friend Edward Dahlberg for the academic year. There, he would work and study beside such artists as the composer John Cage and the poet Robert Creeley. He subsequently joined the permanent faculty at the invitation of the student body in 1951 and became Rector shortly thereafter. While at Black Mountain, he had a second child, Charles Peter Olson, with one of his students, Betty Kaiser. Kaiser became Olson's second common-law wife following his separation from Wilcock in 1956.

Despite financial difficulties and Olson's eccentric administrative style, Black Mountain College continued to support work by Cage, Creeley, Allen Ginsberg, Robert Duncan, Fielding Dawson, Cy Twombly, Jonathan Williams, Ed Dorn, Stan Brakhage, and many other members of the 1950s American avant-garde throughout Olson's rectorship. Olson's influence has been cited by artists in other media, including Carolee Schneemann and James Tenney.

Olson's ideas came to influence a generation of poets, including writers Duncan, Dorn, Denise Levertov, and Paul Blackburn. At 204 centimetres (6 ft 8 in), Olson was described as "a bear of a man", his stature possibly influencing the title of his Maximus work. Olson wrote copious personal letters and helped and encouraged many young writers. His transdisciplinary poetics were informed by a range of disparate and learned sources, including Mayan writing, Sumerian religion, classical mythology, Alfred North Whitehead's process philosophy (as exemplified by Process and Reality [1929]) and cybernetics. Shortly before his death, he examined the possibility that Chinese and Indo-European languages derived from a common source.

When Black Mountain College closed in 1956, Olson oversaw the resolution of the institution's debts over the next five years and settled in Gloucester. He participated in early psilocybin experiments under the aegis of Timothy Leary in 1961 and Henry Murray and served as a distinguished professor at the State University of New York at Buffalo (1963–1965) and visiting professor at the University of Connecticut (1969). From 1965 until his death, Olson received a generous, informal annuity (nominally rendered for his services as editorial consultant to Frontier Press) from philanthropist and publisher Harvey Brown, a former graduate student at Buffalo; this enabled him to take an indefinite leave of absence from his Buffalo professorship and return to Gloucester.

On March 28, 1964, Kaiser was killed by a drunk driver in a head-on automobile accident, although a grieving Olson incorrectly theorized her death as a potential suicide because of her dissatisfaction with her life in the Buffalo area. Her death precipitated Olson into an existential mixture of extreme isolation, romantic longing, and frenzied work. Much of his life was affected by his heavy smoking and drinking, which contributed to his early death from liver cancer. Following his diagnosis, he was transferred to New York Hospital for a liver operation, which never occurred. He died there in 1970, two weeks past his fifty-ninth birthday, while in the process of completing his epic, The Maximus Poems.

== Work ==
=== Early writings ===
Olson's first book, Call Me Ishmael (1947), a study of Herman Melville's novel Moby Dick, was a continuation of his M.A. thesis at Wesleyan University.

In Projective Verse (1950), Olson called for a poetic meter based on the poet's breathing and an open construction based on sound and the linking of perceptions rather than syntax and logic. He favored meter not based on syllable, stress, foot or line but using only the unit of the breath. In this respect Olson was foreshadowed by Ralph Waldo Emerson's poetic theory on breath. The presentation of the poem on the page was for him central to the work becoming at once fully aural and fully visual The poem "The Kingfishers" is an application of the manifesto. It was first published in 1949 and collected in his first book of poetry, In Cold Hell, in Thicket (1953). His second collection, The Distances, was published in 1960.

Olson's reputation rests in the main on his complex, sometimes difficult poems such as "The Kingfishers", "In Cold Hell, in Thicket", and The Maximus Poems, work that tends to explore social, historical, and political concerns. His shorter verse, poems such as "Only the Red Fox, Only the Crow", "Other Than", "An Ode on Nativity", "Love", and "The Ring Of" are more immediately accessible and manifest a sincere, original, emotionally powerful voice. "Letter 27 [withheld]" from The Maximus Poems weds Olson's lyric, historic, and aesthetic concerns. Olson coined the term postmodern in a letter of August 1951 to Robert Creeley.

=== The Maximus Poems ===
In 1950, inspired by the example of Pound's Cantos (though Olson denied any direct relation between the two epics), Olson began writing The Maximus Poems. An exploration of American history in the broadest sense, Maximus is also an epic of place, situated in Massachusetts and specifically the city of Gloucester where Olson had settled. Dogtown, the wild, rock-strewn centre of Cape Ann, next to Gloucester, is an important place in The Maximus Poems. (Olson used to write outside while sitting on a tree-stump in Dogtown.)

The whole work is also mediated through the voice of Maximus, based partly on Maximus of Tyre, an itinerant Greek philosopher, and partly on Olson himself. The last of the three volumes imagines an ideal Gloucester in which communal values have replaced commercial ones. When Olson knew he was dying of cancer, he instructed his literary executor Charles Boer and others to organize and produce the final book in the sequence following Olson's death.

== See also ==
- Niagara Frontier Review

== Selected bibliography ==
- Call Me Ishmael. (1947; reprint, Baltimore: The Johns Hopkins University Press, 1997)
- Projective Verse Poetry New York #3 (1950; frequently reprinted)
- The Distances. (New York: Grove Press Inc., 1960)
- Human Universe and Other Essays, ed. Donald Allen (San Francisco: Auerhahn Society, 1965; Rpt. New York: Grove, 1967)
- Selected Writings, ed. Robert Creeley (New York: New Directions, 1966).
- The Maximus Poems 1-10 (Stuttgart: Jargon, 1953).
- The Maximus Poems 11-22 (Stuttgart: Jargon, 1956).
- The Maximus Poems [Volume I] (New York: Corinth Books/Jargon 24, 1960; London: Cape Goliard, 1960).
- Maximus Poems IV, V, VI (London: Cape Goliard, 1968).
- The Special View of History, ed. Ann Charters (Berkeley: Oyez, 1970).
- Archaeologist of Morning (London and New York: Cape Goliard, 1970).
- The Maximus Poems: Volume Three (New York: Viking/Grossman, 1975).
- Charles Olson and Ezra Pound: An Encounter at St. Elizabeths, ed. Catherine Seelye. New York: Viking, 1975 ISBN 0-670-52400-X
- The Fiery Hunt and Other Plays (Bolinas: Four Seasons Foundation, 1977).
- The Maximus Poems, ed. George Butternick (Berkeley: U of California Press, 1983).
- The Collected Poems of Charles Olson: Excluding The Maximus Poems, ed. George Butternick (Berkeley: U of California Press, 1987).
- A Nation of Nothing but Poetry: Supplementary Poems, ed. George Butternick (Santa Rosa: Black Sparrow Press, 1989).
- Collected Prose, eds. Donald Allen & Benjamin Friedlander (Berkeley: U of California Press, 1997).
- Muthologos: Lectures and Interviews, ed. Ralph Maud (Talonbooks, 2010).

== Correspondence ==
- Mayan Letters, ed. Robert Creeley (Mallorca: Divers Press, 1953; London: Jonathan Cape, 1968).
- Letters for Origin 1950-1956, ed. Albert Glover (New York: Cape Goliard, 1970).
- Charles Olson and Robert Creeley: The Complete Correspondence, eds. George F. Butterick & Richard Blevins, 10 vols. (Black Sparrow Press, 1980–96).
- Charles Olson & Cid Corman: Complete Correspondence 1950-1964, ed. George Evans, 2 vols. (Orono, ME: National Poetry Foundation, 1987, 1991).
- In Love, In Sorrow: The Complete Correspondence of Charles Olson and Edward Dahlberg, ed. Paul Christensen (New York: Paragon House, 1990).
- Charles Olson and Frances Boldereff: A Modern Correspondence, eds. Ralph Maud & Sharon Thesen (Wesleyan University Press, 1999).
- Selected Letters, ed. Ralph Maud (Berkeley: U of California Press, 2001).
- After Completion: The Later Letters of Charles Olson and Frances Boldereff, eds. Sharon Thesen & Ralph Maud (Talonbooks, 2014).
- An Open Map: The Correspondence of Robert Duncan and Charles Olson, eds. Robert J. Bertholf & Dale M. Smith (Albuquerque: University of New Mexico Press, 2017).
- The Collected Letters of Charles Olson and J.H. Prynne, ed. Ryan Dobran (Albuquerque: University of New Mexico Press, 2017).
