= Jack Spicer =

American poet (1925–1965)

- Born: John Lester Spicer; January 30, 1925
- Died: August 17, 1965 (aged 40)
- Education: University of Redlands, University of California, Berkeley
- Writing career
- Movement: San Francisco Renaissance

Jack Spicer (January 30, 1925 – August 17, 1965) was an American poet often identified with the San Francisco Renaissance. In 2009, My Vocabulary Did This to Me: The Collected Poetry of Jack Spicer won the American Book Award for poetry. He spent most of his writing life in San Francisco.

== Early life ==
Jack was born John Lester Spicer on January 30, 1925, in Los Angeles, the elder child of parents Dorothy Clause and John Lovely Spicer.

He graduated from Fairfax High School in 1942, and attended the University of Redlands from 1943 to 1945. While attending the University of Redlands, he befriended Warren Christopher. After graduation he lived in Los Angeles briefly, and worked as a movie extra and a private investigator.

== Career ==
=== Berkeley ===
Spicer ended up in Berkeley, and lived in a boarding house alongside Philip K. Dick. He spent the years 1945 to 1950; and from 1952 to 1955 at the University of California, Berkeley, where he began writing, doing work as a research linguist, and publishing some poetry (though he disdained publishing). In 1950, he refused to sign a "loyalty oath" during a time of McCarthyism.

During this time he searched out fellow poets, but it was through his alliances with Robert Duncan and Robin Blaser that Spicer forged a new kind of poetry, and together they referred to their common work as the Berkeley Renaissance. The three, who were all gay, also educated younger poets in their circle about their "queer genealogy": Rimbaud, Lorca, and other gay writers. Spicer's poetry of this period is collected in One Night Stand and Other Poems (1980). His Imaginary Elegies, later collected in Donald Allen's The New American Poetry 1945–1960 anthology, were written around this time.

=== San Francisco ===
In 1954, he co-founded the Six Gallery in San Francisco, which soon became famous as the scene of the October 1955 Six Gallery reading that launched the West Coast Beat movement. In 1955, Spicer moved to New York City and then to Boston, where he worked for a time in the Rare Book Room of Boston Public Library. Blaser was also in Boston at this time, and the pair made contact with a number of local poets, including John Wieners, Stephen Jonas, and Joe Dunn.

Spicer returned to San Francisco in 1956 and started working on After Lorca. This book represented a major change in direction for two reasons. Firstly, he came to the conclusion that stand-alone poems (which Spicer referred to as his one-night stands) were unsatisfactory and that henceforth he would compose serial poems. In fact, he wrote to Blaser that 'all my stuff from the past (except the Elegies and Troilus) looks foul to me.' Secondly, in writing After Lorca, he began to practice what he called "poetry as dictation". His interest in the work of Federico García Lorca, especially as it involved the cante jondo ideal, also brought him near the poetics of the deep image group. The Troilus referred to was Spicer's then unpublished play of that name. The play finally appeared in print in 2004, edited by Aaron Kunin, in issue 3 of No – A Journal of the Arts.

In 1957, Spicer ran a workshop called Poetry as Magic at San Francisco State College, which was attended by Duncan, Helen Adam, James Broughton, Joe Dunn, Jack Gilbert, and George Stanley. He also participated in, and sometimes hosted, Blabbermouth Night at a literary bar called The Place. This was a kind of contest of improvised poetry and encouraged Spicer's view of poetry as being dictated to the poet.

Spicer refused to have his work copyrighted, and after 1960, Spicer refused to publish his work outside of California. He considered City Lights Bookstore a tourist destination, and boycotted selling his work there. He was unable to hold a job and fell into poverty, however, so by 1964 he started selling books at City Lights.

== Death and legacy ==
After many years of alcohol abuse, Spicer fell into a hepatic coma, a brain disorder precipitated by liver failure, in the elevator of his apartment building, and later died aged 40 in the poverty ward of San Francisco General Hospital on August 17, 1965.

Spicer's view of the role of language in the process of writing poetry was probably the result of his knowledge of modern pre-Chomskyan linguistics and his experience as a research-linguist at Berkeley. In the legendary Vancouver lectures he elucidated his ideas on "transmissions" (dictations) from the Outside, using the comparison of the poet as crystal-set or radio receiving transmissions from outer space, or Martian transmissions. The radio oracle derived from Cocteau's film Orphée, often cited by Spicer in his lectures. Although seemingly far-fetched, his view of language as "furniture", through which the transmissions negotiate their way, is grounded in the structuralist linguistics of Zellig Harris and Charles Hockett. (Poems of his final book, Language, refer to morphemes and graphemes). Spicer is acknowledged as a precursor for the Language poets.

Since the publication of The Collected Books of Jack Spicer (1975, 1st ed.), his reputation has grown. The Collected Books of Jack Spicer gathered Spicer's works beginning from 1957, and specifically did not include his earlier poetry per Spicer's requests. A selection of his earlier work was published in One Night Stand and Other Poems, edited by Donald Allen. My Vocabulary Did This to Me: The Collected Poetry of Jack Spicer (2008) edited by Peter Gizzi and Kevin Killian, won the American Book Award in 2009.

== Bibliography ==
A select list of publications authored by Spicer, in order by ascending date published.

- Spicer, John L. (Fall 1949). Brown, Lynne (ed.). "The Poet and Poetry: A Symposium". The Occident (essay). Berkeley, California: University of California, Berkeley.
- Spicer, John L.; Reed, David W. (July 1952). "Correlation Methods of Comparing Ideolects in a Transition Area". Language (essay). 28 (3). Baltimore, Maryland: Waverley Press Inc.: 348–359. doi:10.2307/410105. JSTOR 410105.
- Spicer, Jack (1965). A Redwood Forest. San Francisco, California: White Rabbit Press.
- Spicer, Jack (1975). Blaser, Robin (ed.). The Collected Books of Jack Spicer (1 ed.). Santa Rosa, California: Black Sparrow Press. ISBN 9780876852422.
- Spicer, Jack (1980). Allen, Donald (ed.). One Night Stand and Other Poems. San Francisco, California: Grey Fox Press. ISBN 978-0912516462.
- Spicer, Jack (1994). The Tower of Babel: Jack Spicer's Detective Novel (1994), with afterword by Lew Ellingham & Kevin Killian, Hoboken, NJ: Talisman House.
- Spicer, Jack (1998). Gizzi, Peter (ed.). The House That Jack Built: The Collected Lectures of Jack Spicer. Hanover, New Hampshire: Wesleyan University Press. ISBN 9780819569622.
- Spicer, Jack (2008). My Vocabulary Did This to Me: The Collected Poetry of Jack Spicer, edited Peter Gizzi & Kevin Killian, Wesleyan UP.
- Spicer, Jack (2011). Jack Spicer’s Beowulf, Part 1, edited by David Hadbawnik & Sean Reynolds, introduction by David Hadbawnik, Lost and Found: The CUNY Poetics Documents Initiative, New York.
- Spicer, Jack (2011). Jack Spicer’s Beowulf, Part II, edited by David Hadbawnik & Sean Reynolds, afterword by Sean Reynolds, Lost and Found: The CUNY Poetics Documents Initiative, New York.
- Spicer, Jack (2021). Be Brave to Things: The Uncollected Poetry and Plays of Jack Spicer, ed. Daniel Katz, Wesleyan University Press.
- Spicer, Jack (2025). Even Strange Ghosts Can Be Shared: The Collected Letters of Jack Spicer, edited by Daniel Benjamin, Kelly Holt, and Kevin Killian, Wesleyan University Press.
