= Micah Ballard =

American poet (born 1975)

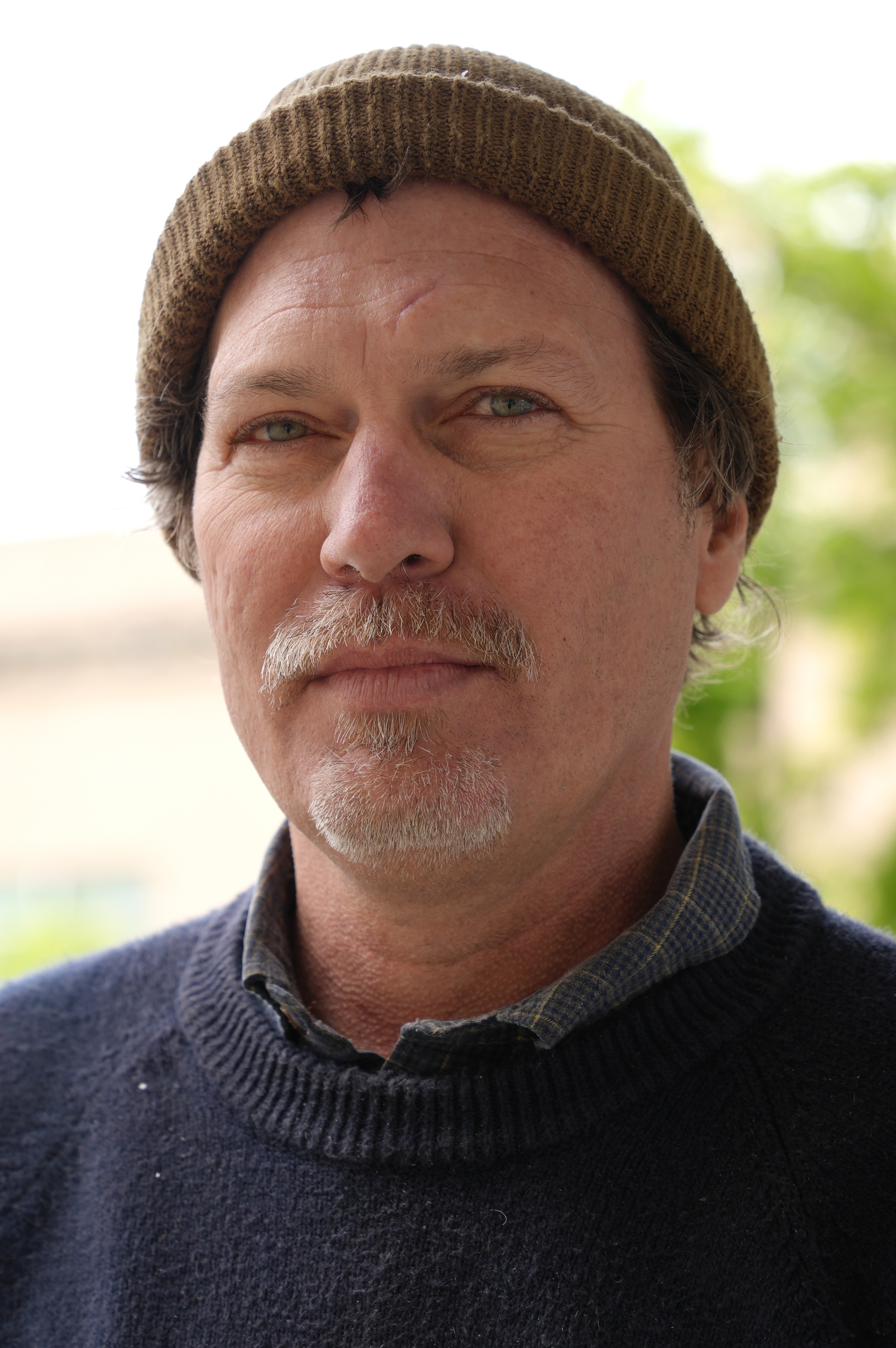
Ballard in 2025

Micah Ballard is a poet born in Baton Rouge, Louisiana on September 23, 1975. Since 1999 he has lived in San Francisco with his wife, poet Sunnylyn Thibodeaux. Under the imprints Auguste Press and Lew Gallery Editions they have printed over 30 books by various poets and artists.

Ballard attended the Poetics Program at New College of California in San Francisco's mission district where he worked with David Meltzer, Joanne Kyger, and Tom Clark. From 2000 to 2007 he directed the Humanities Program there.

In 2007 Ballard started the short-lived Lew Gallery with Portland artist Jeff Butler and curated such notable shows as "Artworks" by David Meltzer and "Some of the Worlds Diamonds: Pieces from Living Rooms," a collaboration with painters and poets from San Francisco to New York City.

Ballard has given poetry readings at a variety of venues, including the San Francisco State Poetry Center, City Lights Bookstore, SOMArts, Pacific Northwest College of Art, Denver Museum of Contemporary Art, and the Poetry Project at St. Mark's Church. His poems have appeared in 6x6, Blue Book, Boog City, Damn the Caesars, Drunken Boat, Joe Brainard's Magazine, Le Palais de Nuit, LIT, Mirage #4 Period(ical), The Recluse, Try!, Vanitas, and the anthologies Bay Poetics and Evidence of the Paranormal, among others.

Currently, he is on the editorial board for the Contemporary Poetry Series at University of New Orleans Press. Ballard co-directs the Masters of Fine Arts in Writing Program at the University of San Francisco.

Ballard's second full-length collection of poetry, Waifs and Strays, was nominated for a California Book Award.

== Bibliography ==
=== Full-length poetry collections ===
- Uncollected Poems (FMSBW, 2026) ISBN 979-8-9921594-6-2
- Busy Secret (FMSBW, 2024) ISBN 9798989413348
- The Michaux Notebook (FMSBW, 2019) ISBN 978-1732943919
- Afterlives (Bootstrap Productions, 2016) ISBN 978-0-9886108-6-6
- Waifs and Strays (City Lights Books, 2011) ISBN 978-0-87286-544-0
- Parish Krewes (Bootstrap Productions, 2009) ISBN 978-0-9821600-1-5

=== Criticism ===
- Negative Capability in the Verse of John Wieners (Auguste Press, 2001) (2nd edition Bootstrap Productions, 2017) ISBN 978-1-946741-07-3

=== Chapbooks ===
- Angel Dust (above/ground press, 2025)
- Busy Secret (above/ground press, 2024)
- Muddy Waters (State Champs, 2022)
- Selected Prose (2008-2019) (Blue Press, 2020)
- Daily Vigs (Bird & Beckett Books, 2019)
- Vesper Chimes (Gas Meter, 2014)
- Widows & Orphans (Lew Gallery, 2011)
- Darrell (Blue Press, 2007)
- New Poems (Blue Press, 2006)
- Evangeline Downs (Ugly Duckling Presse, 2006)
- Scenes from the Saragossa Manuscript (Snag Press, 2004)
- Emblematic (Old Gold, 2004)
- In the Kindness of Night (Blue Press, 2003)
- Bettina Coffin (Red Ant, 2003)
- Absinthian Journal (Old Gold, 2002)
- Chandeliers from the Metairie Cemetery (Blue Press, 2001)

=== Collaborative books ===
- Poems from the New Winter Palace with Michael Carr (arrow as aarow, 2010)
- Easy Eden with Patrick James Dunagan (Push, 2009)
- Death Race V.S.O.P. with Will Yackulic & Cedar Sigo (Red Ant, 2005)
- Wrought Iron & Burgundy with Sunnylyn Thibodeaux (Auguste Press, 2004)
- A Plywood Press Primer with Cedar Sigo (Plywood Press, 2000)

=== Anthology appearances ===
- Bay Poetics (Faux Press, 2005)
- Evidence of the Paranormal (Owl Press, 2003)
