= Émile Munier =

French painter

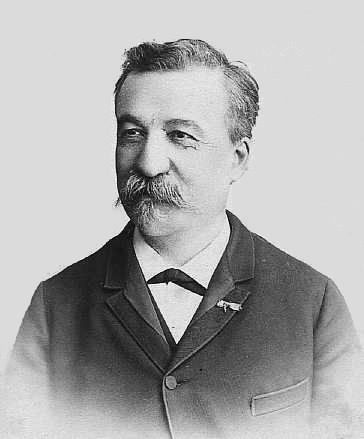
- Munier c. 1893
- Born: 2 June 1840; Paris, France
- Died: 29 June 1895 (aged 55); Paris, France
- Known for: Painter
- Movement: French Academic, Realism
- Patrons: Chapman H. Hyams

Émile Munier (2 June 1840 – 29 June 1895) was a French academic artist and student of William-Adolphe Bouguereau.

== Biography ==
Émile Munier was born in Paris on 2 June 1840 and lived with his family at 66 rue des Fossés, St. Marcel. His father, Pierre François Munier, was an artist upholsterer at the Manufacture Nationale des Gobelins and his mother, Marie Louise Carpentier, was a polisher in a cashmere cloth mill. Émile and his two brothers, François and Florimond, were talented artists and each spent some time at the Gobelins. At the factory Abel Lucas trained Munier as a draughtsman and he developed a close relationship with Lucas and his family, eventually marrying Lucas' daughter, Henriette, in 1861. In 1867, Henriette gave birth to a son, Emile Henri. Six weeks after the birth, having contracted severe rheumatism, Henriette died prematurely. Sargine Augrand, a student of Lucas and a close friend of Émile and Henriette (before she died), caught Émile's eye; they married in 1872 and lived in a small apartment and studio. The couple had one child, a daughter, Marie-Louise, born in 1874.

== Career ==
During the 1860s, Munier received three medals at the Beaux-Arts and in 1869 he exhibited at the Paris Salon. He became a great supporter of the Academic ideals and a follower of Bouguereau, whose subject matter would be an important inspiration to the young Munier. Bouguereau's quality of work and composition are reflected in Munier's artworks. The pair became close friends and Munier frequently visited Bougereau's studio; the latter used the nicknames "La sagesse" or "Le sage Munier" when referring to Munier. The glass designer Émile Gallé was another artist Munier was known to work with from around 1869.

Munier ceased work at the tapestry factory in 1871 and devoted his time solely to painting; he also began teaching classes to adults three nights a week. Leland Stanford, Jr., the only child of Governor Leland Stanford of California and his wife Jane Stanford, died aged fifteen in 1884, and during that year Munier was commissioned by Jane Stanford to immortalise their son by way of a painting. The oil on canvas entitled Angel comforting his grieving mother shows the boy with his hand on his mother's shoulder returning to earth as an angel to comfort her. Today, in the 21st century, the painting forms part of a display in the Cantor Centre for the Visual Arts at Stanford University.

In 1885 he painted, and exhibited at the Paris Salon, Trois Amis (Three Friends). This painting, representing a chubby girl playing on her bed with a kitten and a dog, was an extremely successful work, being reproduced in many forms and used for publicity posters by Pears soap. With this work, Emile asserted himself as one of 'the' painters of young children and their pets; it was eventually acquired by an American collector.

Among his many American patrons were Chapman H. Hyams and his wife, who were important collectors of contemporary French paintings during the nineteenth century and favoured artists like Henner, Bouguereau, Gérôme, Vinel and Schreyer. Munier painted their portrait in 1889, and it, along with much of their collection, is now in the New Orleans Museum of Art.

During the 1890s Munier continued to paint peasant, mythological and religious subjects; he also portrayed animals, scenes depicting fishing, landscapes and seascapes. Many of his works featured his children as his models, particularly his daughter. In 1893 he exhibited L'esprit de la chute d'eau, at the Paris Salon, a nude nymph which is not unlike Naissance de Vénus by Bouguereau.

In 1895 Munier painted La jeune fille et le panier de chatons, but on 29 June, a few weeks after his 55th birthday, he died.

== Selected works ==
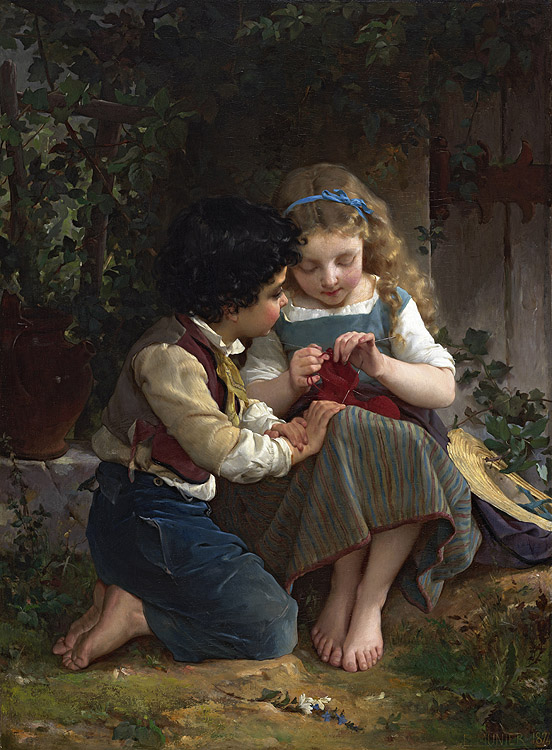
A Special Moment, 1874

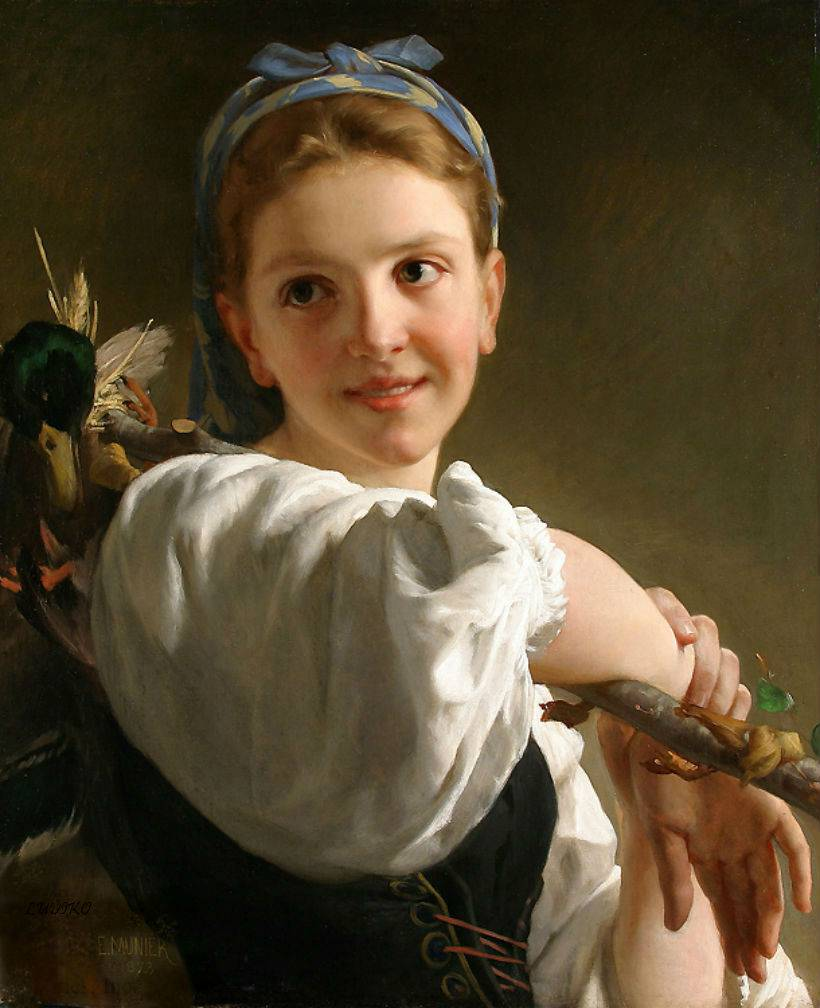
Back from the Market, 1873

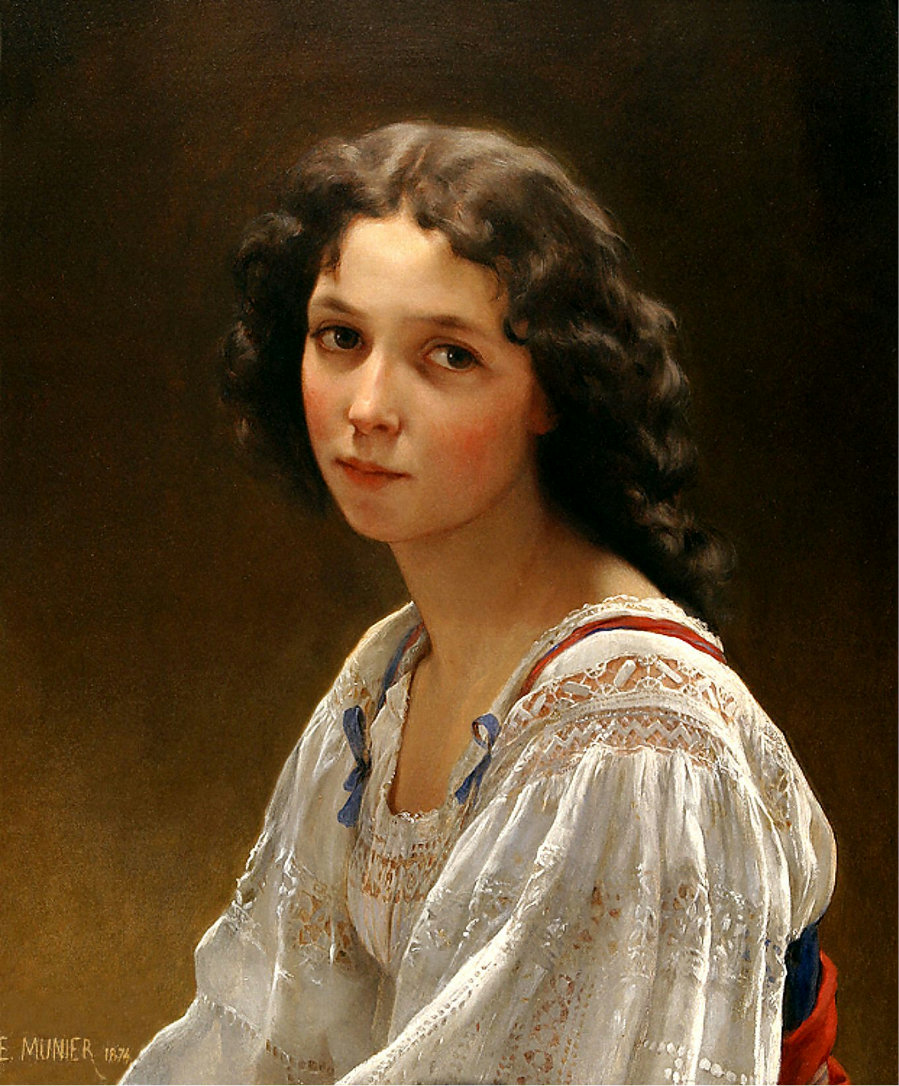
Head of a Young Girl, 1874

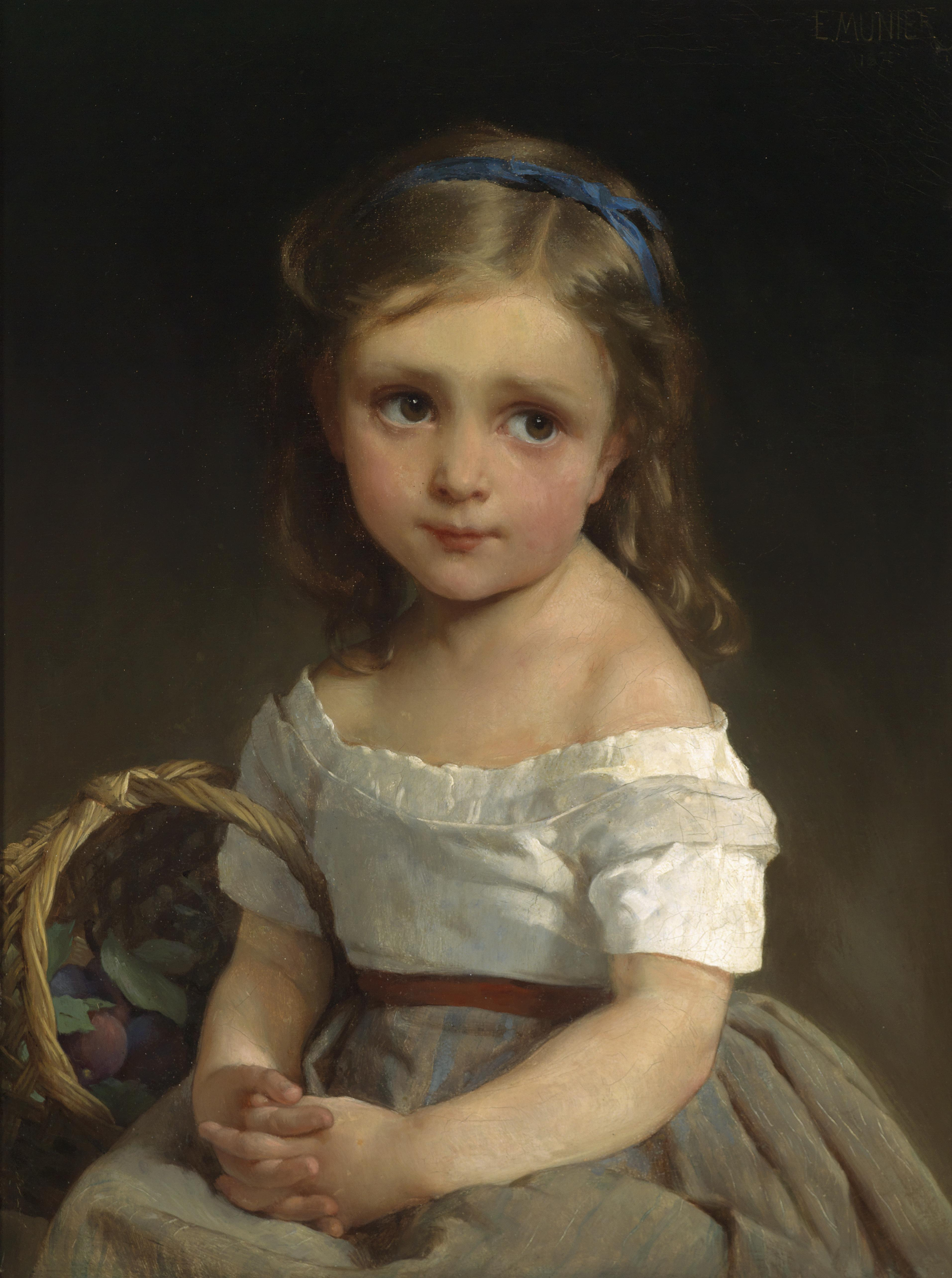
Girl with a Basket of Plums, 1875

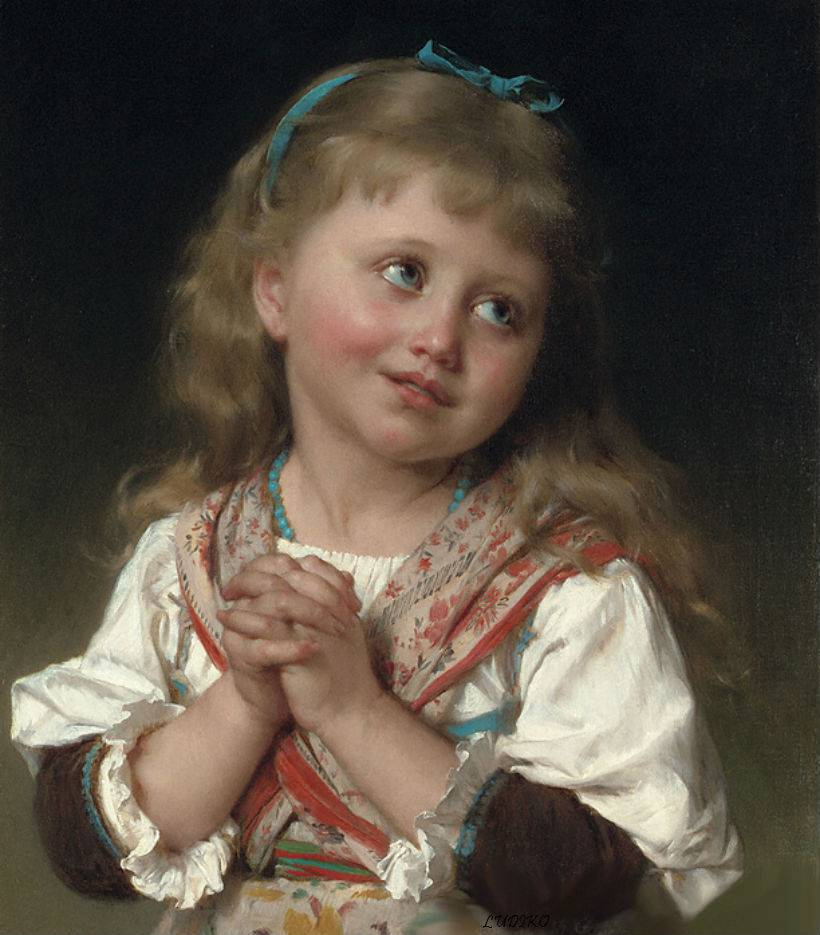
May I?, 1881

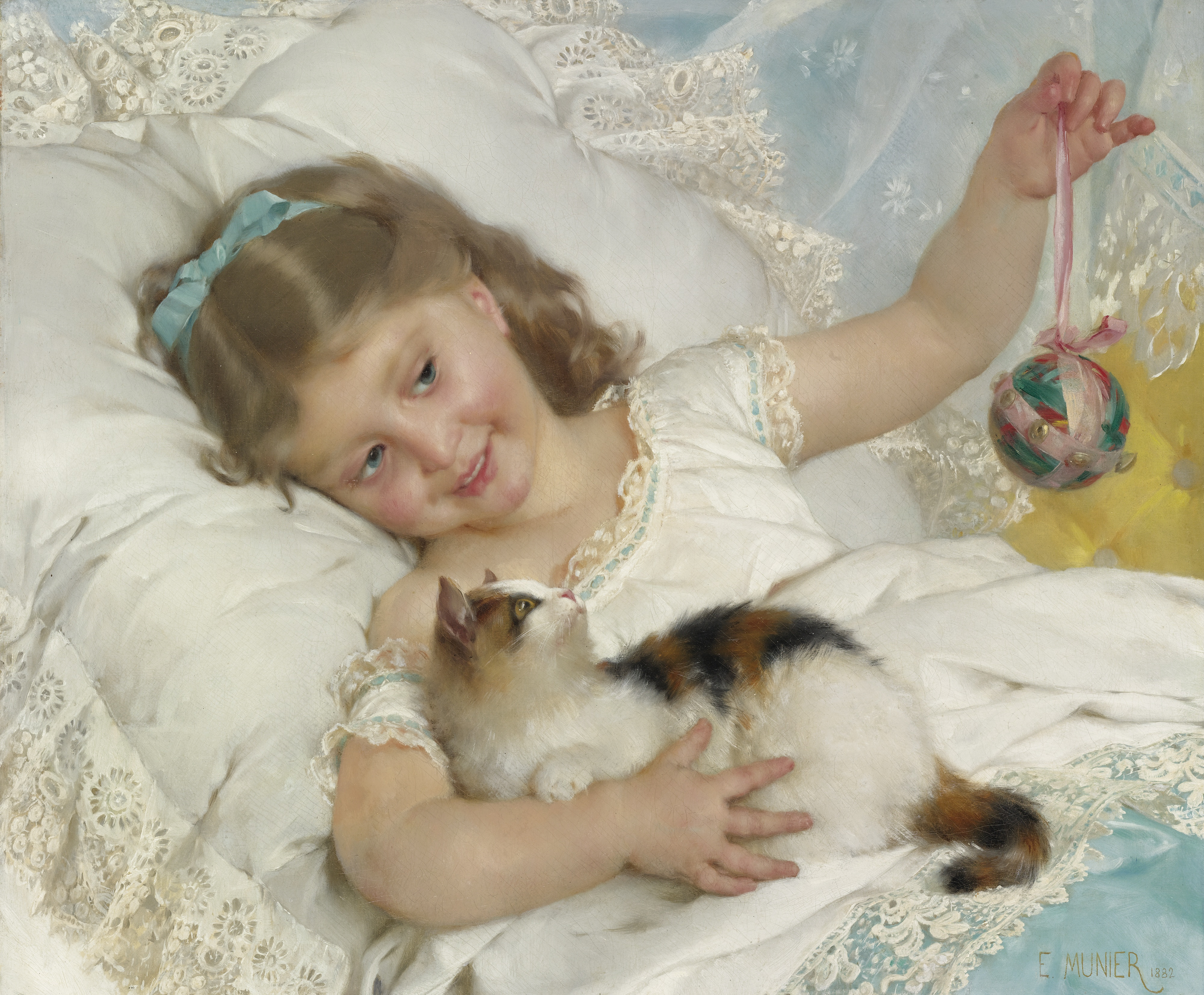
Young Girl and Cat, 1882

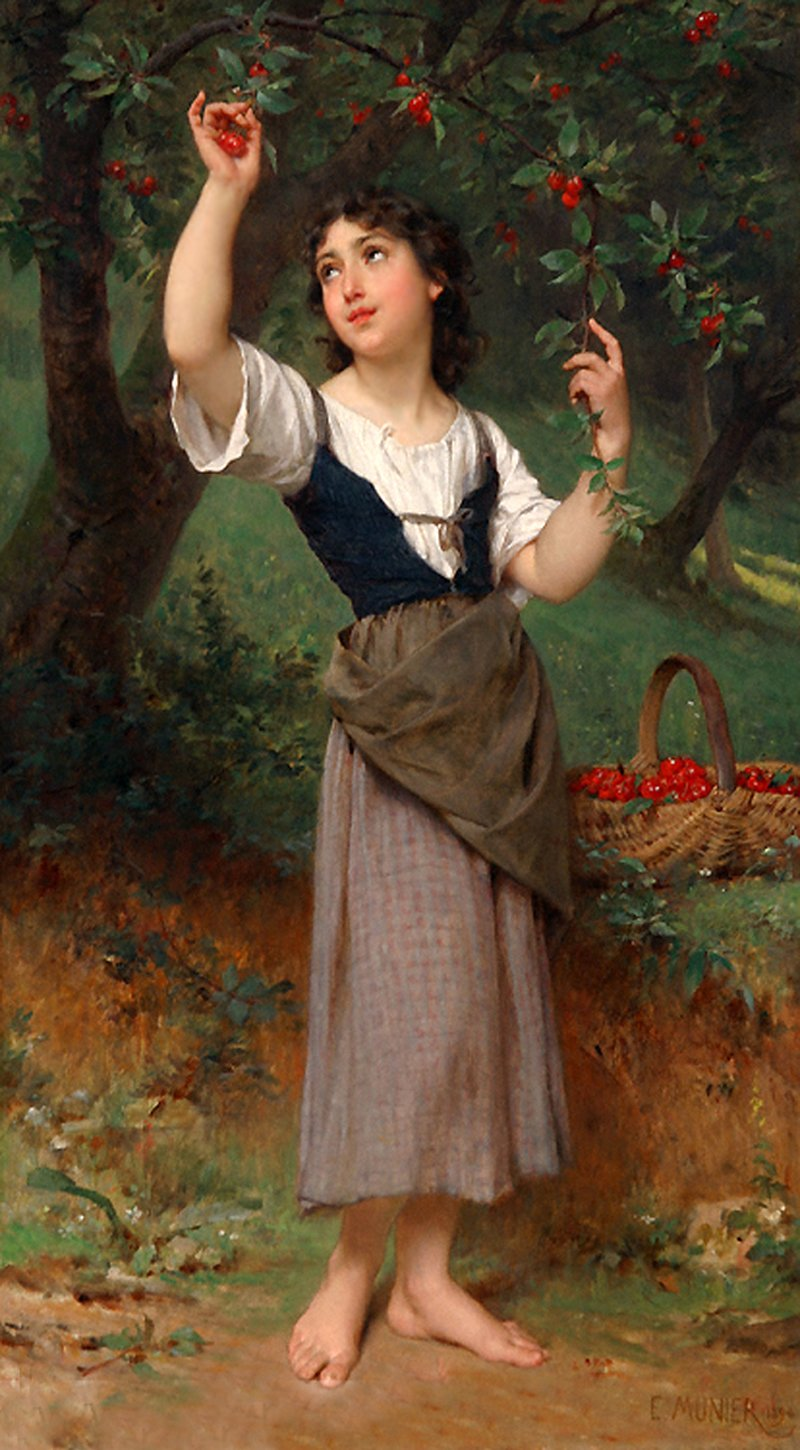
The Cherry Tree, 1890, Rehs Galleries, Inc., New York City

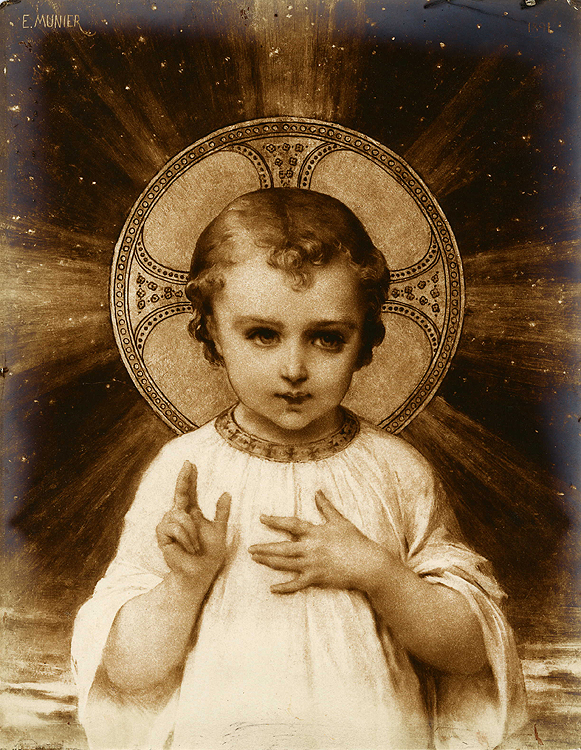
Jesus, 1891

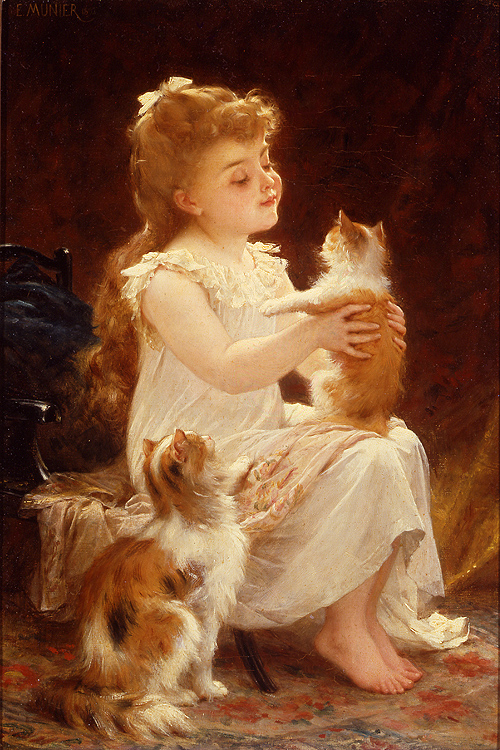
Playing with the Kitten, 1893

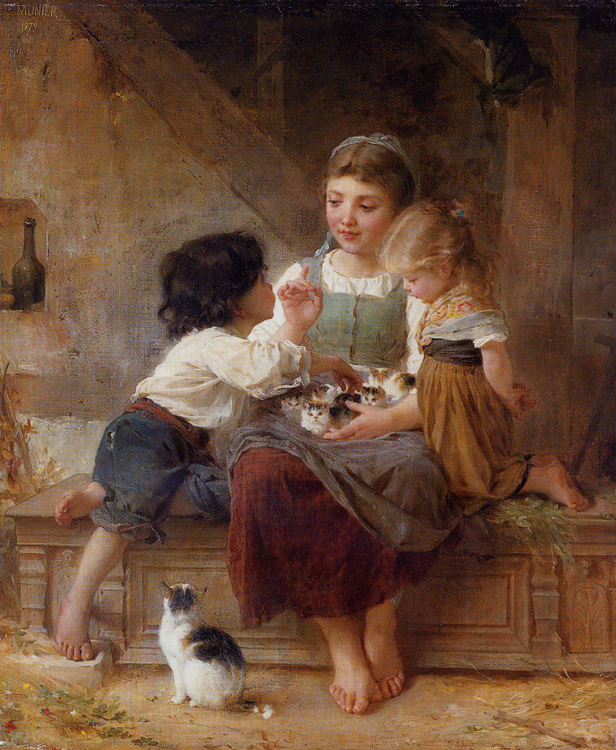
A Happy Family, 1879

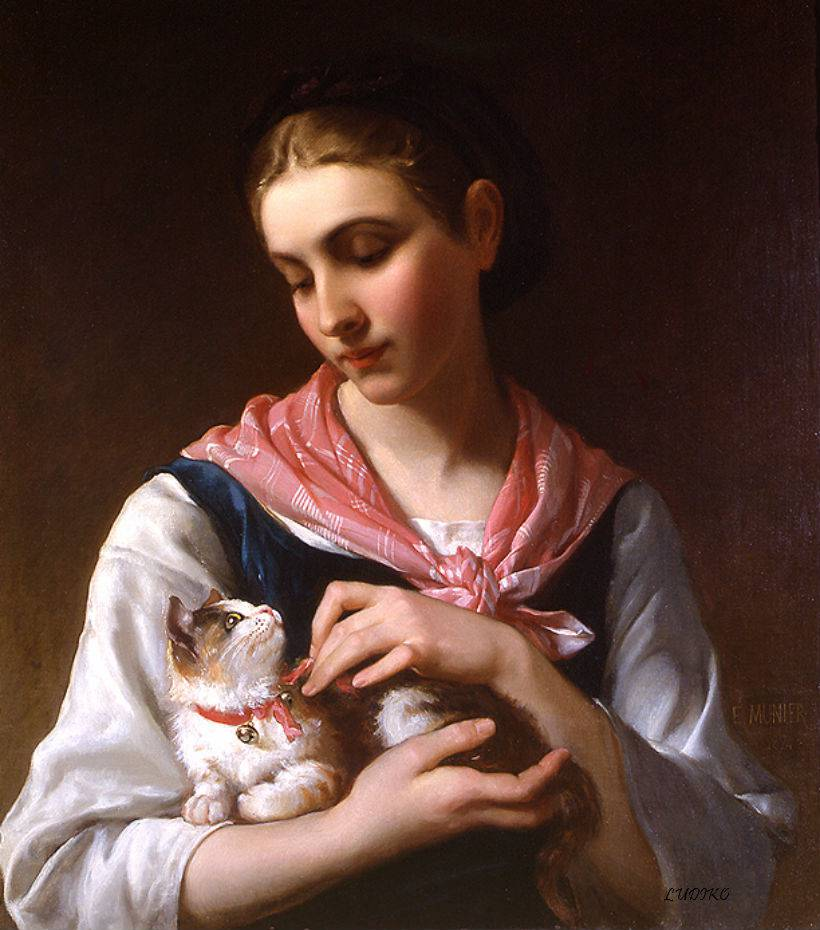
Favourite Kitten, 1874

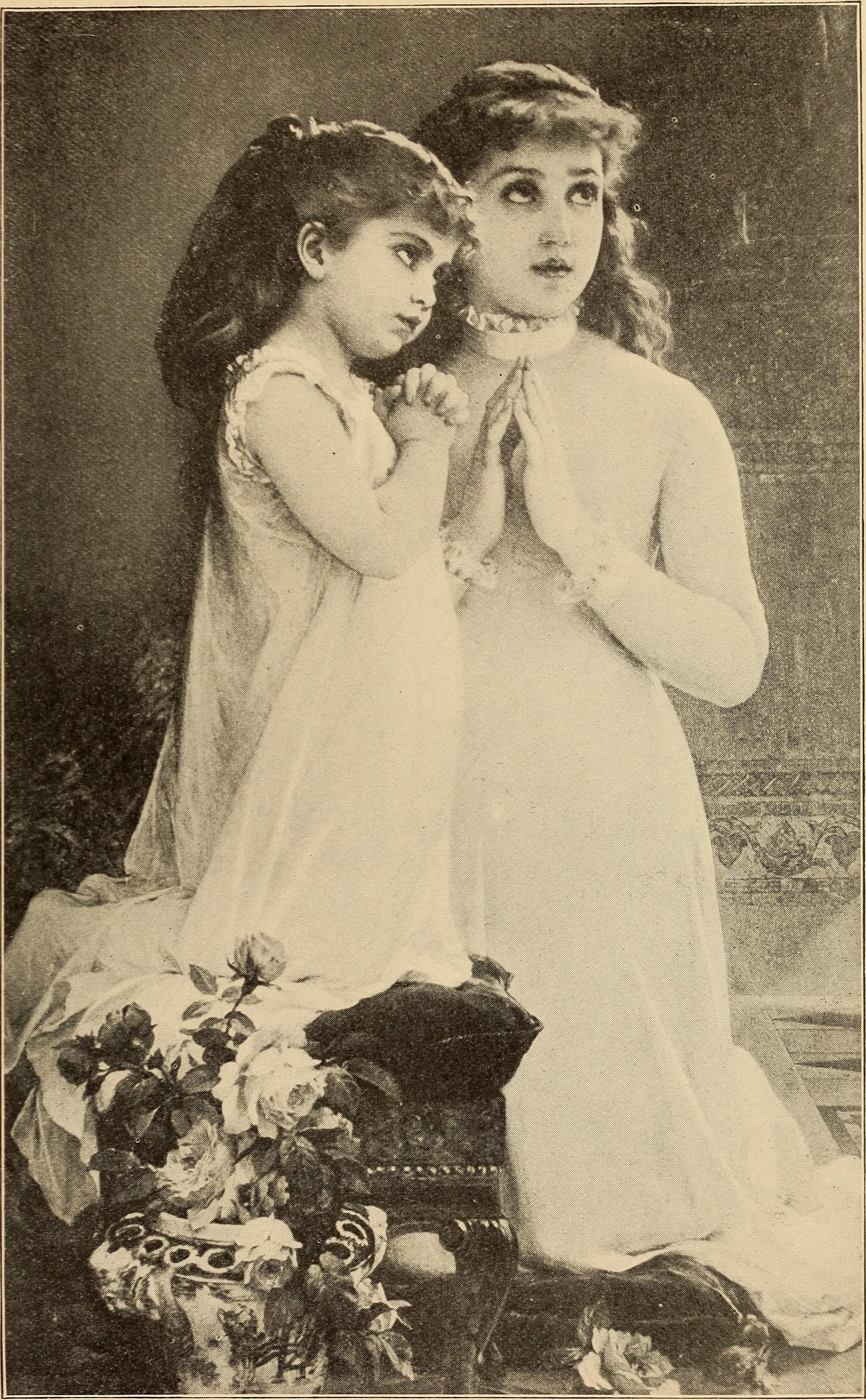
Morning Prayer, 1888

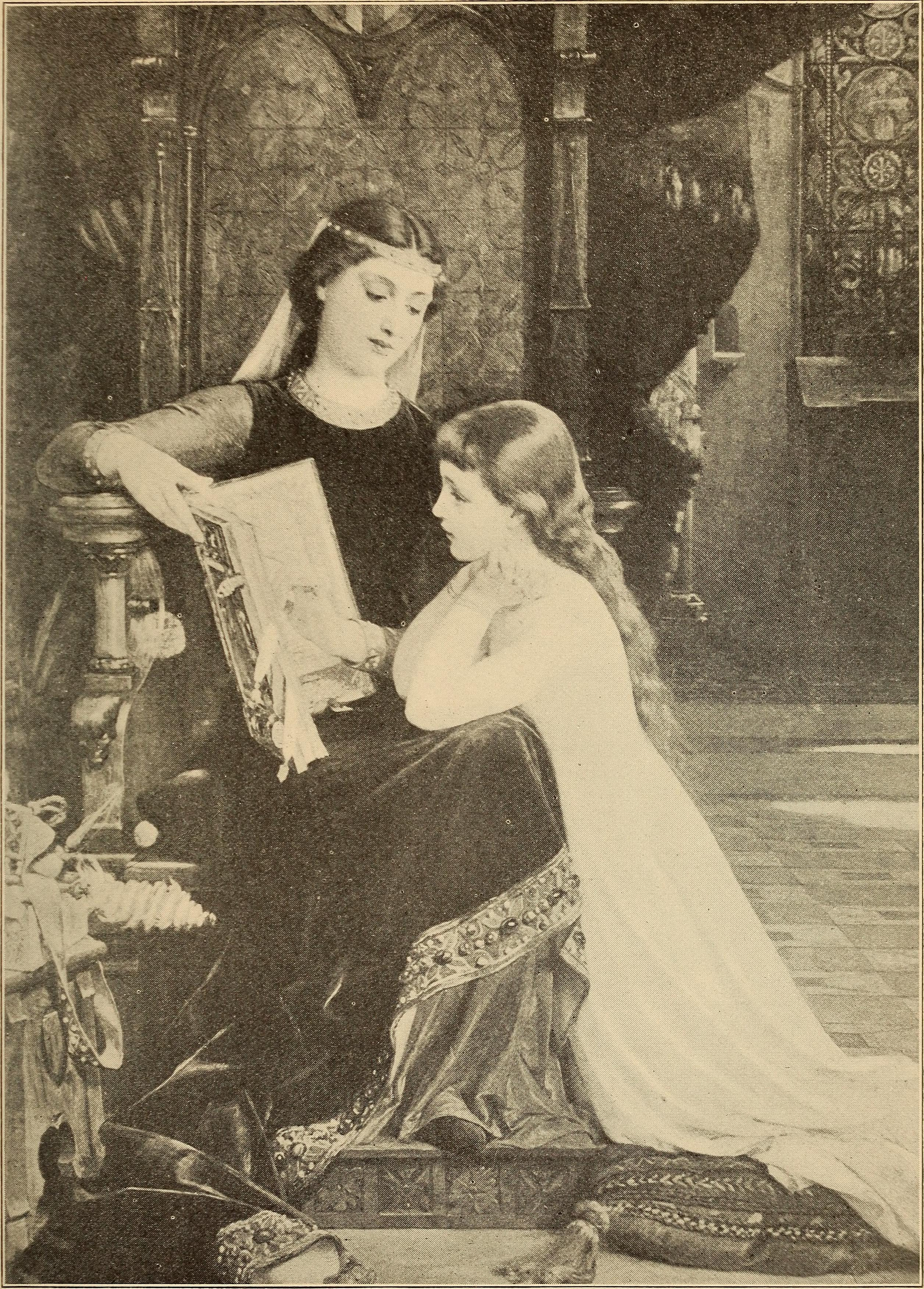
Reading Lesson, 1888

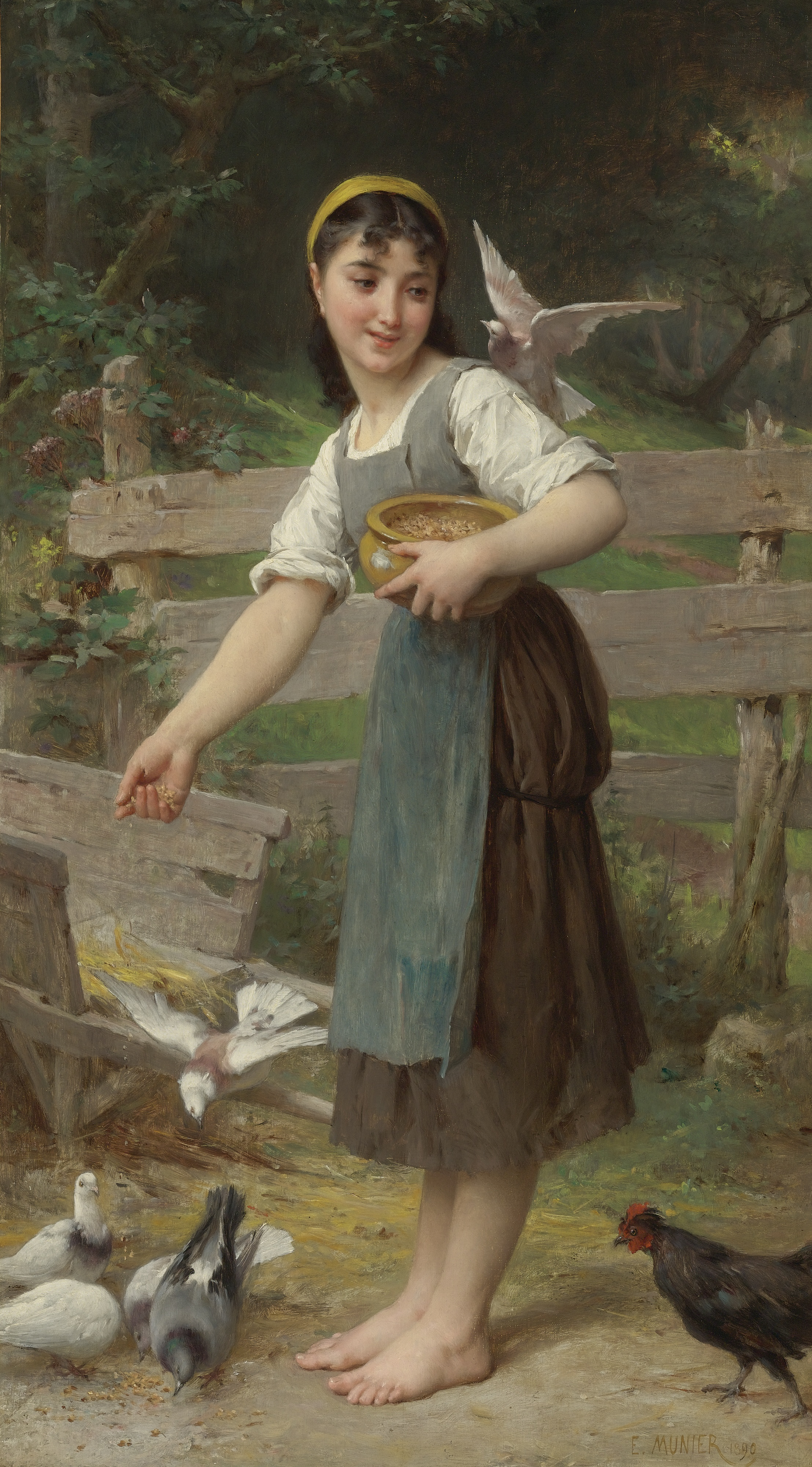
Feeding the Doves, 1890

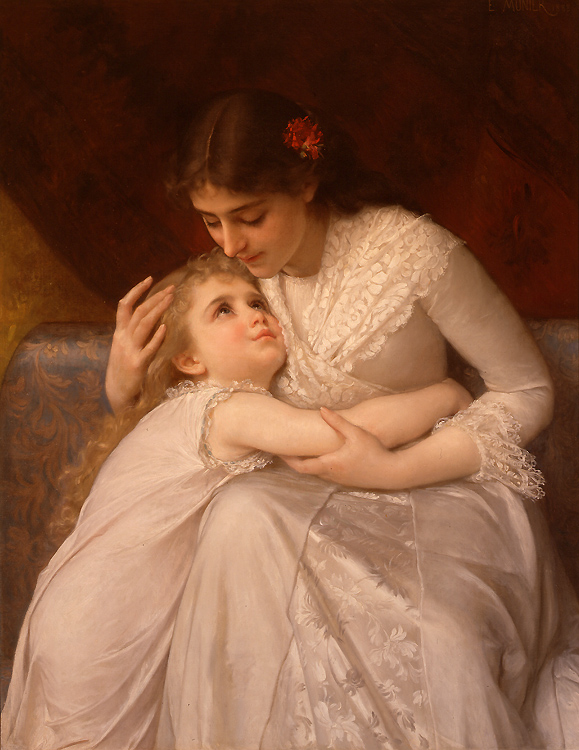
Pardon Mama, 1888
