= Première rêverie =

1889 painting by William-Adolphe Bouguereau

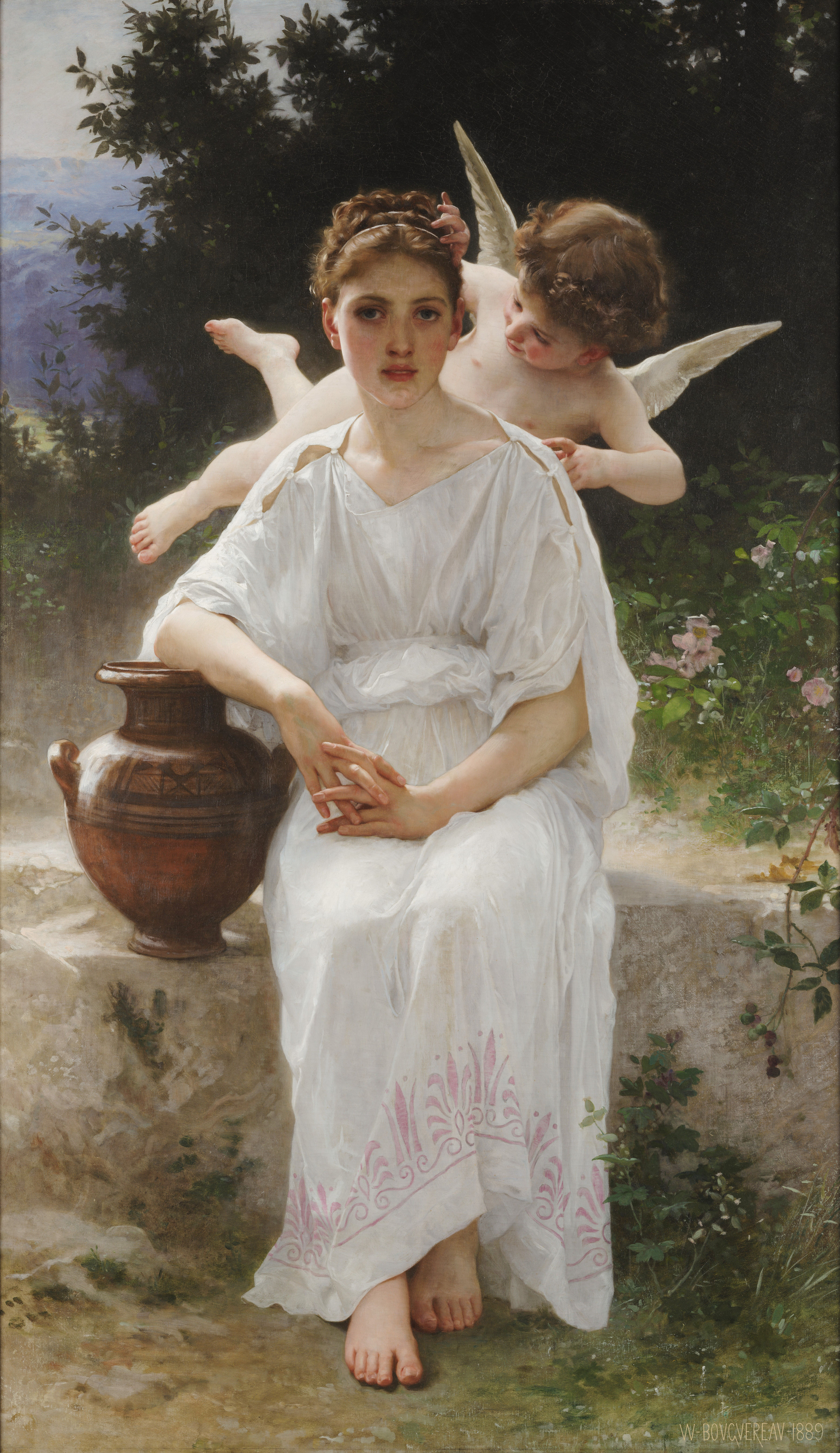
- Artist: William-Adolphe Bouguereau
- Year: 1889
- Medium: Oil on canvas
- Dimensions: 157.48 cm × 92.71 cm (62.00 in × 36.50 in)
- Location: New Orleans Museum of Art, Louisiana

Première rêverie (English: First Reverie), also known in English as Whisperings of Love, is a painting by nineteenth-century French artist William-Adolphe Bouguereau. The work was completed in 1889 and is held at the New Orleans Museum of Art.

== Background ==
William-Adolphe Bouguereau (1825–1905) was a French academic artist who began his career at the École des Beaux-Arts de Paris, producing works based on classical myths and legends. He later became sought after in France and the United States for portraits and decorative paintings. Although some contemporary artists, including Edgar Degas and Vincent van Gogh, criticized his work as excessively finished and soft, Bouguereau received considerable recognition during his lifetime, including several awards at the Salon de Paris.

Bouguereau's style was highly polished and idealized. He often used models with porcelain-like skin and depicted provincial subjects. Describing his view of painting, Bouguereau stated: "There's only one kind of painting. It's the painting that presents the eye with perfection, the kind of beautiful and impeccable enamel you find in Veronese and Titian."

== Description ==
Première rêverie, which measures 157.48 x 92.71 cm (62 x 36 1/2 in), features a young woman sitting on rock with a vase beneath her arm and a Cupid whispering into her ear. The model for this painting, whose identity is unknown, also featured in Bouguereau's Boucles d'oreilles (1889–90), Le Travail interrompu (1891; Mead Art Museum), and Daphnis et Chloe.

== Legacy and provenance ==
Bouguereau completed Première rêverie in early 1889, naming it Le chant de l'Amour (The Song of Love). In May of that year the work was sold to the art dealership Tooth and Sons and renamed Première rêverie. That August the dealership sold the painting to a person named Groves. The painting was later gifted to the New Orleans Museum of Art by Mr. and Mrs. Chapman H. Hyams; the museum's catalogue lists it as Whisperings of Love. Eyewitness Books' guide to New Orleans lists the painting as one of the top ten exhibits at the museum, and Christie's considers the work one of Bouguereau's more important contemporary paintings.

In late 1889, Gustave Doyen, with some input from the Bouguereau, completed a reduction of Première rêverie; this work, measuring 101 by 58 centimetres (40 in × 23 in), is now housed at the Cummer Museum of Art and Gardens. A print of Bougureau's painting, produced by John Douglas Miller, is held at the Art Institute of Chicago under the title The First Whisper of Love; this title had previously been attached to the reduction when it was sold by Tooth and Sons.

In the catalogue raisonné for Bouguereau, Première rêverie has number 1889/06, whereas the reduction is listed as number 1889/06A.

== See also ==
- William-Adolphe Bouguereau gallery
