= Metairie Cemetery =

Cemetery in Louisiana, US

- U.S. National Register of Historic Places
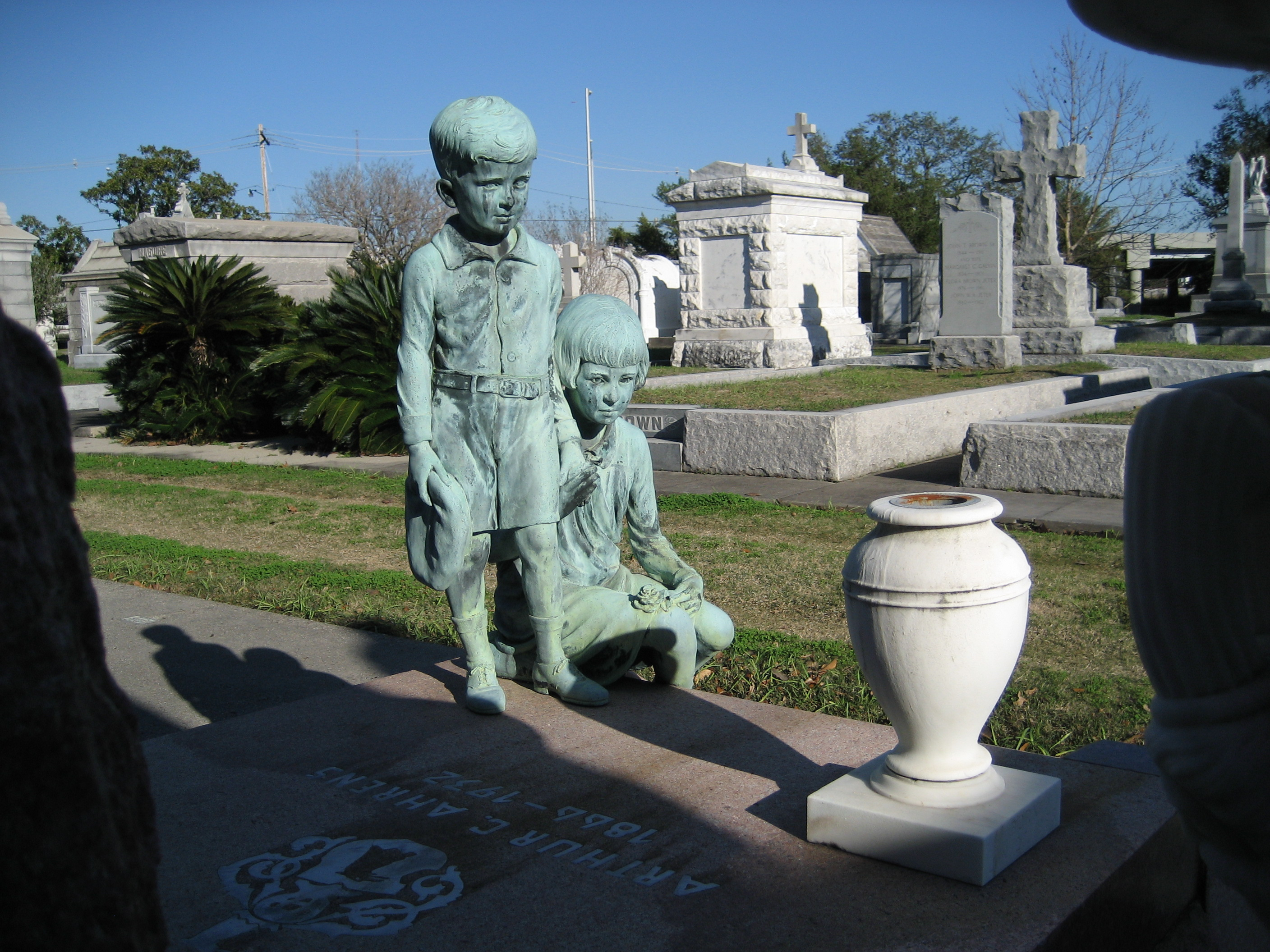
- Monuments at Metairie Cemetery

- Location within East New Orleans Location within Louisiana Location within the United States
- Location: Junction of I-10 and Metairie Road, New Orleans, Louisiana
- Coordinates: 29°59′9″N 90°7′4″W
- Built: 1872
- Architect: Benjamin Morgan Harrod
- Architectural style: Italianate, Classical revival, Gothic revival
- NRHP reference No.: 91001780
- Added to NRHP: December 6, 1991

Metairie Cemetery is a historic cemetery in New Orleans, Louisiana, United States, founded in 1872. The name has caused some people to mistakenly presume it is located in Metairie, Louisiana, but it is located within the New Orleans city limits on Metairie Road (and formerly on the banks of the since filled-in Bayou Metairie).

== History ==
=== Metairie Course ===
==== 1838 ====
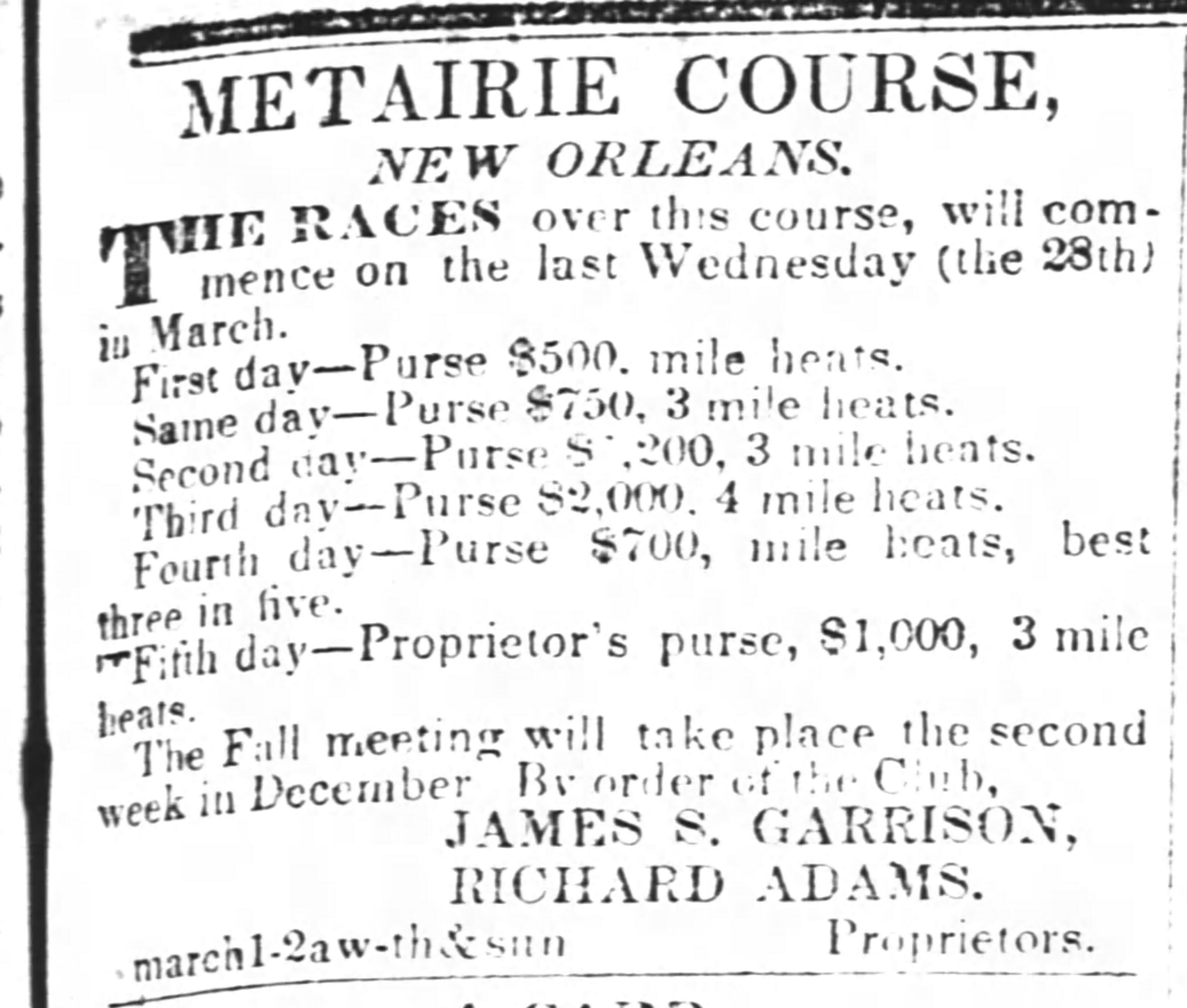
Metairie Race Course Announcement The Times Picayune Thursday March 1, 1838

Before becoming a cemetery, the site, established on a high-and-dry ridge along Bayou Metairie (now Metairie Road), was a horse racing track, founded in 1838 by Col. James Garrison and Richard Adams who acquired the land from the New Orleans Canal and Banking Company. Its first president was Alexander Barrow and board of governors included: George B. Mulligan, Thomas W. Chinn, Balie Peyton, Samuel Jarvis Peters, Thomas J. Wells, George B. Ogden (President of New Orleans Canal and Banking Company), and Miner Kenner.

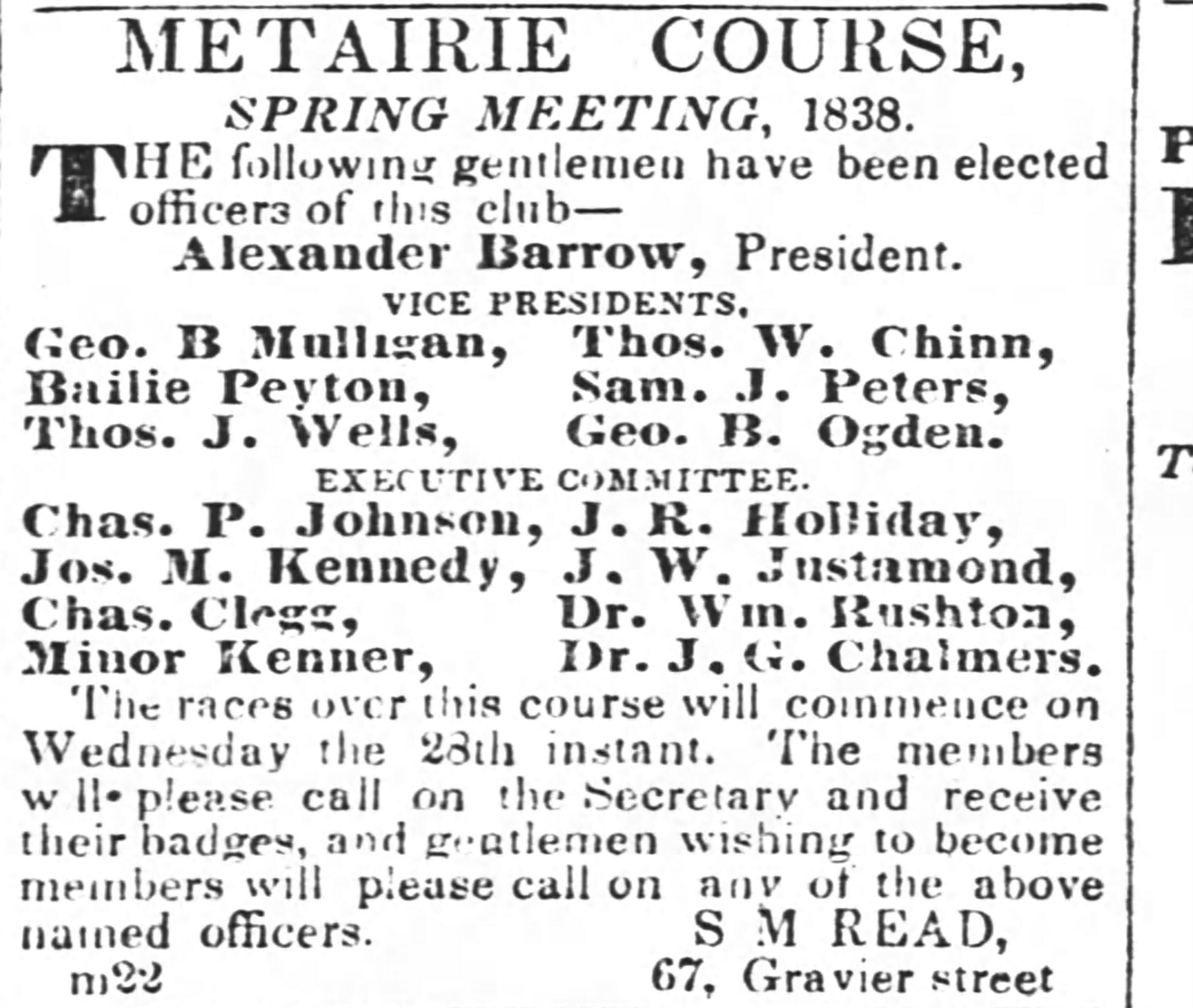
Metairie Course Board of Governors The Times Picayune March 29, 1838

==== 1839 ====
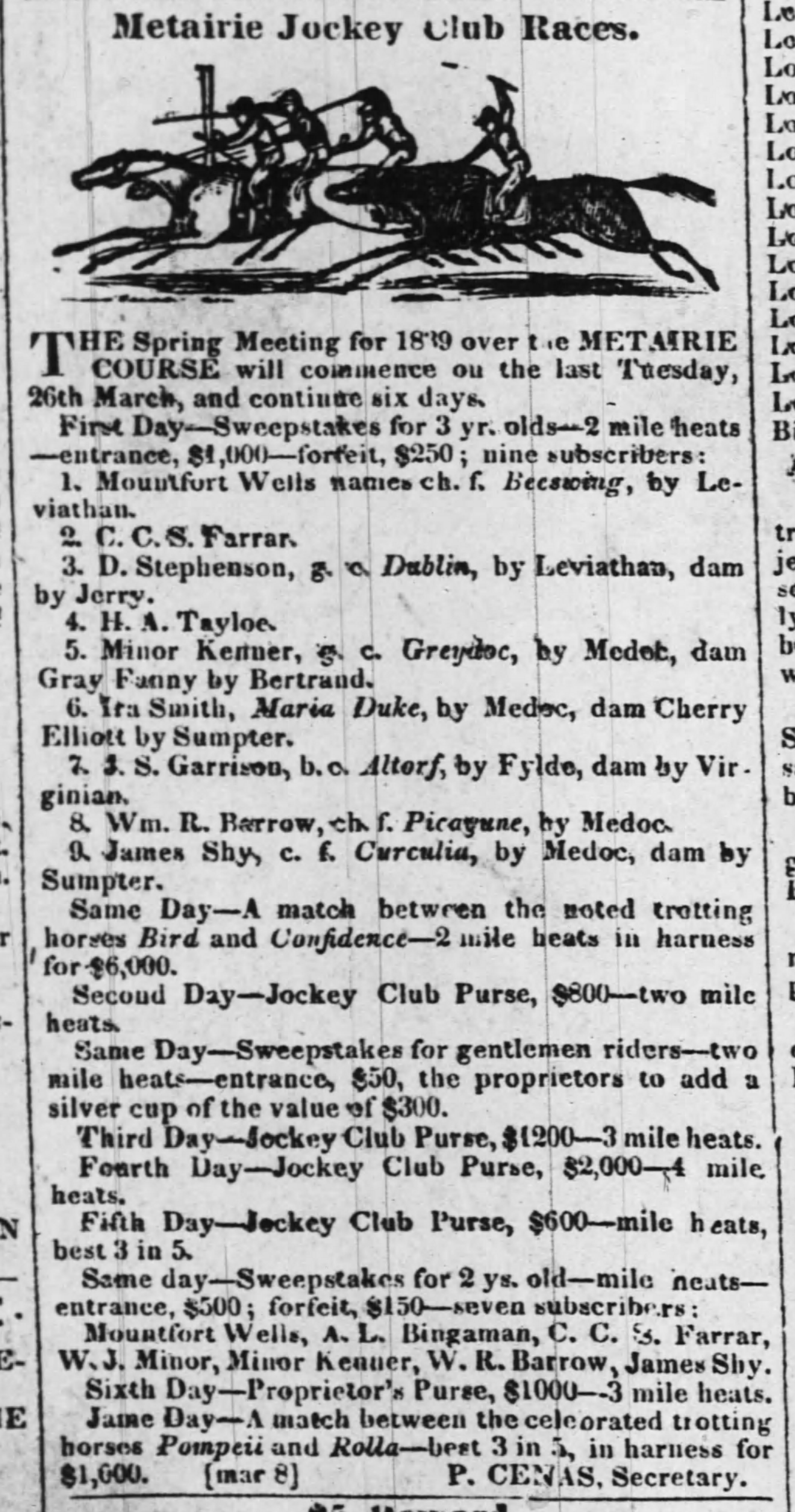
Spring 1839 Race Announcement Metairie Jockey Club Metairie Race Course New Orleans The Times Picayune March 8, 1839

The Spring Meeting of The Metairie Jockey Club for 1839 over the Metairie Course commenced on Tuesday, March 26, and lasted for six days. The First Day of racing Sweepstakes for 3-year olds, 2 Mile Heats, Entrance Fee $1,000, Forfeit Fee $250, Nine Subscribers: Montfort Wells' Beeswing, C.C.S. Farrar, D. Stephenson's Dublin, H.A. Tayloe, Minor Kenner's Greydoc, Ira Smith's Maria, James S. Garrison's Altorf, William R. Barrow's Picayune, James Shy's Curculia. Same Day, A match between the noted trotting horses Bird and Confidence, 2-mile heats in harnesses for $6,000. Second Day, Wednesday, March 27, Jockey Club Purse $800, 2 Mile Heats. Same Day Sweepstakes for Gentlemen Riders, 2 Mile Heats, Entrance Fee $50, the proprietors to add a silver cup, value $300. Third Day, Jockey Club Purse $1,200, 3 Mile Heats. Fourth Day, Jockey Club Purse $2,000, 4 Mile Heats. Fifth Day, Jockey Club Purse $600, Mile Heats, best 3 in 5. Same Day, Sweepstakes for 2 Year Olds, Mile Heats, Entrance Fee $500, Forfeit Fee $150, seven subscribers:Montfort Wells, A.L. Bingaman, C.C.S. Farrar, W.J. Minor, Minor Kenner, W.R. Barrow, James Shy. Sixth Day, Proprietors Purse, $1,000, 3 Mile Heats. Same Day, Match between the celebrated trotting hosrse Pompeii and Rolla, best 3 in 5, in harness for $1,000. P. CENAS Secretary.

==== 1848 ====
In 1848 Richard Ten Broeck, later part of the syndicate that purchased Lexington, bought the course and likewise established a joint-stock company, officially founding The Metairie Jockey Club.

The race track was the site of the famous Lexington-Lecomte Race, April 1, 1854, billed as the "Great States" race. Former President Millard Fillmore attended. While racing was suspended because of the American Civil War, it was used as a Confederate Camp (Camp Moore) until David Farragut took New Orleans for the Union in April 1862. Metairie Cemetery was built upon the grounds of the old Metairie Race Course after it went bankrupt.

=== Conversion to a cemetery ===
The race track, which was owned by the Metairie Jockey Club, refused membership to Charles T. Howard, a local resident who had gained his wealth by starting the first Louisiana State Lottery. After being refused membership, Howard vowed that the race course would become a cemetery. After the Civil War and Reconstruction, the track went bankrupt and Howard was able to see his curse come true. Today, Howard is buried in his tomb located on Central Avenue in the cemetery, which was built following the original oval layout of the track itself. Mr. Howard died in 1885 in Dobbs Ferry, New York, when he fell from a newly purchased horse.

Undoubtedly the Metairie Cemetery is destined to be the great Necropolis of the South. As far as its location, ornaments, care and poetry are concerned, we say that this great city of the dead is unrivaled.

— Staff writer, "All Saints' Day: Yesterday's Visitations at the Homes of the Dead", New Orleans Daily Picayune (November 2, 1877)

Metairie Cemetery was previously owned and operated by Stewart Enterprises, Inc., of Jefferson, Louisiana. However, in December 2013, Service Corporation International bought Metairie Cemetery and other Stewart locations.

== Sights ==
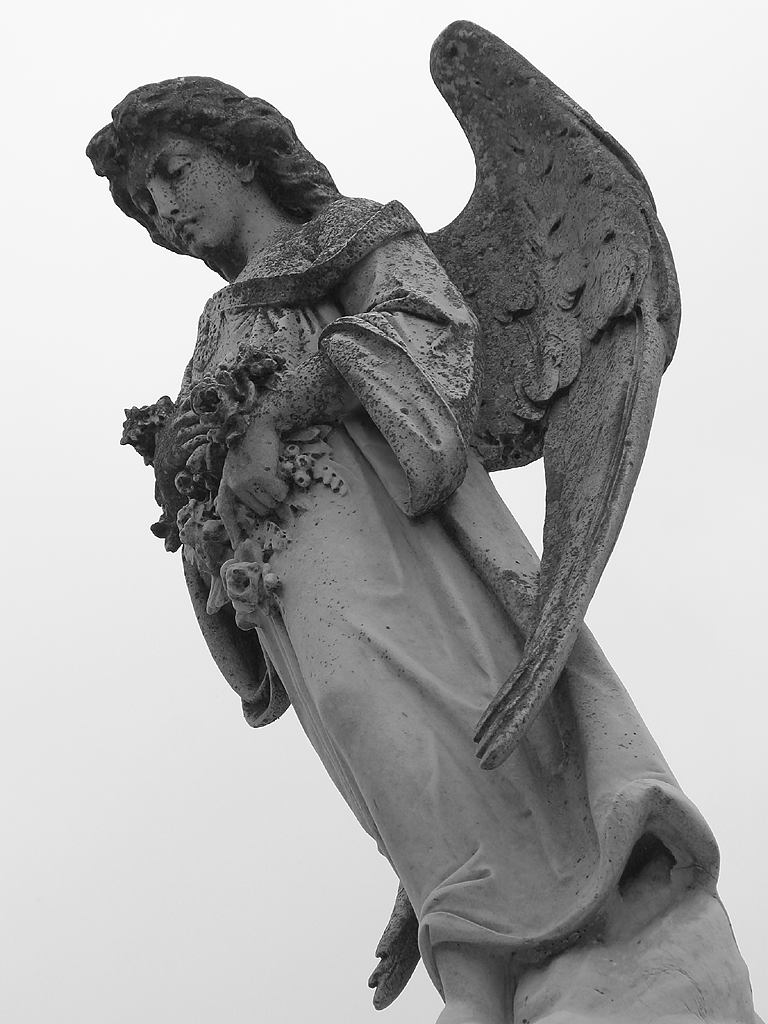
Angel statue at Metairie Cemetery

Metairie Cemetery has the largest collection of elaborate marble tombs and funeral statuary in the city.

One of the most famous is the Army of Tennessee, Louisiana Division monument, a monumental tomb of Confederate soldiers of the American Civil War. The monument includes two notable works by sculptor Alexander Doyle (1857–1922):

- Atop the tomb is an 1877 equestrian statue of General Albert Sidney Johnston on his horse "Fire-eater", holding binoculars in his right hand. General Johnston was for a time entombed here, but the remains were later removed to Texas.
- To the right of the entrance to the tomb is an 1885 life-size statue represents a Confederate officer about to read the roll of the dead during the American Civil War. The statue is said to be modeled after Sergeant William Brunet of the Louisiana Guard Battery, but is intended to represent all Confederate soldiers.

Other notable monuments in Metairie Cemetery include:

- the pseudo-Egyptian pyramid;
- Laure Beauregard Larendon's tomb, which features Moorish details and beautiful stained glass;
- the former tomb of Storyville madam Josie Arlington;
- the Moriarty tomb with a marble monument with a height of 60 feet (18 m) tall, which required the construction of a temporary special spur railroad line to transport the monument's building materials to the cemetery; and
- the memorial of 19th-century police chief David Hennessy, whose murder sparked a riot.

The initial construction of at least one of these elaborate final resting places – restaurateur Ruth Fertel's mausoleum – is estimated to have cost between $125,000 to $500,000 (in late 20th century dollars).

== Notable burials ==
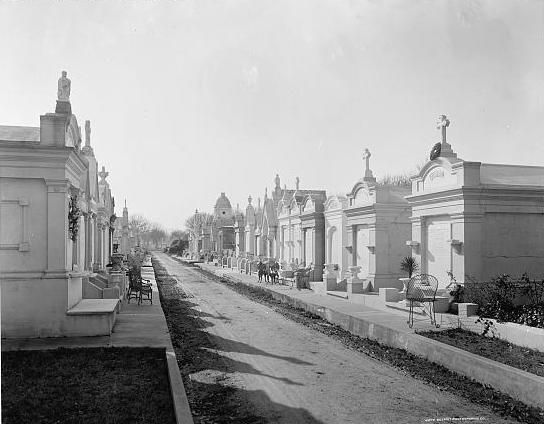
Metairie Cemetery in the late nineteenth century

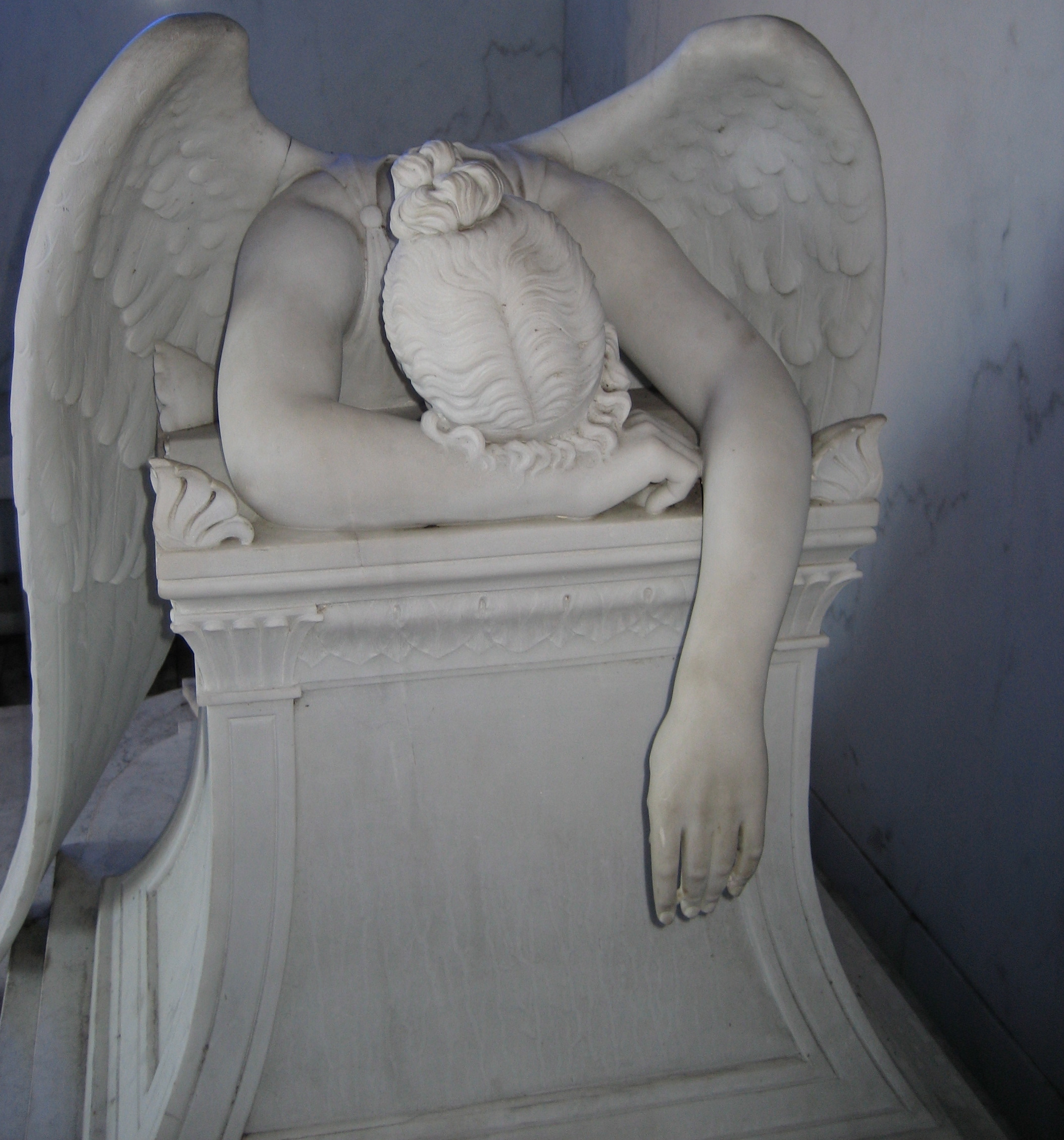
Marble statuary monument to Chapman H. Hyams' sisters. The sculpture is a copy of Story's Angel of Grief

- Algernon Sidney Badger, New Orleans government official during and after Reconstruction
- Jay Batt, businessman and politician
- T. L. Bayne, first Tulane University football coach and organizer of first football game in New Orleans
- P. G. T. Beauregard, a Confederate General who started the American Civil War (1861-1865), Superintendent of West Point (1861)
- Tom Benson, owner of New Orleans Saints and New Orleans Pelicans
- John Bernecker, stunt performer
- Joseph C. Canizaro, commercial real estate developer and philanthropist
- Silvestro Carollo, crime boss and leader of the New Orleans crime family from the 1920s to the 1940s.
- Renato Cellini, operatic conductor
- William C. C. Claiborne, first U.S. governor of Louisiana
- Marguerite Clark, stage and silent film actress
- Lewis Strong Clarke, sugar planter and Republican politician
- Isaac Cline, chief meteorologist at the Galveston, Texas, office of the US Weather Bureau from 1889 to 1901. In that role, he became an integral figure in the devastating Galveston Hurricane of 1900.
- Hamilton D. Coleman, a businessman who held Louisiana's 2nd congressional district seat from 1889 to 1891. He was the last Republican member of the U.S. House from Louisiana until 1973.
- Al Copeland, founder of Popeyes Louisiana Kitchen
- Ève Curie, French-born writer, journalist, and pianist
- Nathaniel Cortlandt Curtis Jr., architect, founder of Curtis and Davis Architects and Engineers.
- Jefferson Davis was buried at Metairie Cemetery, but his remains were later moved to Hollywood Cemetery in Richmond, Virginia in 1893.
- Dorothy Dell, film actress of the 1930s
- Dorothy Dix, advice columnist
- Charles E. Dunbar, New Orleans attorney and civil service reformer
- Fred A. Earhart, pharmacist and politician, one-time acting mayor of New Orleans
- Charles E. Fenner, founder of brokerage house that became part of Merrill Lynch, Pearce, Fenner, & Smith
- Joachim O. Fernández, U.S. representative from Louisiana's 1st congressional district from 1931 to 1941
- Ruth U. Fertel, founder of Ruth's Chris Steak House
- Benjamin Flanders, Reconstruction-era state governor and New Orleans mayor
- Jim Garrison, New Orleans district attorney
- Edward James Gay III, U.S. senator
- Michael Hahn, speaker of the Louisiana House of Representatives and governor of Louisiana
- William W. Heard, governor of Louisiana from 1900 to 1904
- William G. Helis Sr., American oilman, racehorse/owner breeder
- Andrew Higgins, inventor of the "Higgins Boat"
- Al Hirt, jazz trumpeter
- Ken Hollis, state senator from Jefferson Parish
- John Bell Hood, Confederate general
- Chapman H. Hyams, stockbroker, businessman and philanthropist
- John E. Jackson Sr., New Orleans lawyer and state Republican chairman from 1929 to 1934
- Grace King, author
- Julius Kruttschnitt, railroad executive
- Henry Richardson Labouisse Jr., diplomat and statesman
- Richard W. Leche, governor of Louisiana
- Harry Lee, sheriff of Jefferson Parish, Louisiana
- Gia Maione, singer
- Carlos Marcello, reputed crime boss and leader of the New Orleans crime family from the late-1940s to the early-1980s.
- Louis H. Marrero, Jefferson Parish Police juror & president, Jefferson Parish sheriff, senator, Lafourche Basin Levee Board
- Samuel D. McEnery, governor of Louisiana
- John Albert Morris, the "Lottery King"
- deLesseps Story "Chep" Morrison Sr., mayor of New Orleans
- deLesseps Story "Toni" Morrison Jr., state legislator from Orleans Parish
- Isidore Newman, New Orleans philanthropist and founder of the Maison Blanche department store chain and the regarded Isidore Newman School
- Elwyn Nicholson, state senator from 1972 to 1988, grocery store owner
- Margaret Norvell, lighthouse keeper and namesake of the coastguard cutter USCGC Margaret Norvell
- Lionel Ott, member of the Louisiana State Senate from 1940 to 1945 and the last New Orleans finance commissioner from 1946 to 1954
- Mel Ott, Hall of Fame Major League Baseball player
- Benjamin M. Palmer, pastor of First Presbyterian Church of New Orleans (1856–1902)
- John M. Parker, governor of Louisiana
- Bob Pettit, basketball player
- P. B. S. Pinchback, first African American governor of Louisiana 1872–73
- Louis Prima, bandleader
- Anne Rice, author
- Stan Rice, poet
- John Leonard Riddell, melter and refiner of Mint 1839–1848, Postmaster 1859–1862, inventor of the binocular microscope
- John G. Schwegmann, supermarket pioneer and member of both houses of the Louisiana State Legislature
- James Z. Spearing, U.S. representative, 1924–1931, from Louisiana's 2nd congressional district
- Edgar B. Stern, businessman and civic leader; founder of WDSU-TV
- Edith Rosenwald Stern, philanthropist
- Norman Treigle, opera star
- Helen Turner, painter
- Cora Witherspoon, stage and screen character actress
- Sam Zemurray, produce magnate; co-founder of Cuyamel Fruit Company and one-time President of United Fruit Company

== See also ==
- Eclipse Race Course
- Fair Grounds Race Course
- Historic Cemeteries of New Orleans
- List of United States cemeteries
