= Cedar Sigo =

Suquamish American writer (b. 1978)

- Born: February 2, 1978 (age 48); Washington state
- Education: Naropa Institute

Cedar Sigo (born February 2, 1978, in Washington State) is a Suquamish American writer of art, literature and film.

== Background ==
Cedar Sigo was raised in Suquamish located within the Port Madison Indian Reservation in Washington state. In 1995 he was awarded a scholarship to study at Naropa Institute's Jack Kerouac School of Disembodied Poetics in Boulder Colorado. It was there that he studied and interacted with well-known poets, such as Allen Ginsberg, Anne Waldman, Lisa Jarnot, Alice Notley, and Joanne Kyger.

Sigo is the author of several books and pamphlets of poetry, some of which have been included in various magazines and anthologies. Sigo has given poetry readings in various locations across the United States, including the Poetry Project at St. Mark's Church, the Museum of Contemporary Art, The San Francisco Poetry Center, San Francisco Art Institute, and the Suquamish Community House, also called sgwәdzadad qәł ?altxw (The House of Awakened Culture). His poems have appeared in The Poker, Yolanda Pipeline's Magazine, Shampoo, RealPoetik, Puppy Flowers, Suspect Thoughts, 6x6, and New York Nights, among other journals. Currently, he still lives in Washington State.

== Works ==
- Selected Writings: Cedar Sigo (Ugly Duckling Presse, 2003) ISBN 978-0-9727684-1-2
- Selected Writings (Expanded Second Edition) (Ugly Duckling Presse, 2005) ISBN 978-1-933254-05-0
- Death Race V.S.O.P. (with Micah Ballard & Will Yackulic) (Red Ant, 2005)
- Expensive Magic (House Press, 2008)
- Stranger in Town (City Lights Publishers, 2010) ISBN 978-0-87286-536-5
- "Language Arts" (Wave Books, 2014)
- "Royals" (Wave Books, 2017)
- There You Are: Interviews, Journals, and Ephemera (ed. Cedar Sigo for Joanne Kyger) (Seattle: Wave Books, 2017). ISBN 9781940696584
