= Poetic journal =

A poetic journal is a literary genre combining aspects of poetry with the daily, or near daily, "takes" of journal writing. Born of twin impulses: to track change in daily life and to memorialize experience, poetic journals owe allegiances to Asian writing — particularly the Japanese haibun of Matsuo Bashō, The Pillow Book of Sei Shōnagon, and the poetic diaries of Masaoka Shiki — as well as Objectivist poets and others associated with Donald Allen's anthology The New American Poetry 1945-1960. Unlike traditional diaries or journals that focus primarily on recounting a day's experience, poetic journals emphasize the act of writing itself in collaboration with the day's account. Taking its cue from post-Jack Kerouac writers, like Bernadette Mayer and Clark Coolidge, the poetic journal aims to be all-inclusive as well as timely and attentive. To quote Tyler Doherty in his introduction to For the Time Being: The Bootstrap Book of Poetic Journals, "[The poetic journal] doesn't try to tell us what the world is, so much as remind us that the world is."

== Influences ==
Asian Influences: Matsuo Bashō, Sei Shōnagon, Masaoka Shiki.
19th Century Naturalist Influences: Henry David Thoreau.
Objectivist influences: William Carlos Williams, Lorine Niedecker, Charles Reznikoff.

== Selected poetic journals ==
Poetic Journal Anthologies:
Tyler Doherty & Tom Morgan: For the Time-Being: The Bootstrap Book of Poetic Journals Poetic Journals:
Paul Blackburn: The Journals
Tyler Doherty: Bodhidharma Never Came to Hatboro
Larry Eigner: Readiness / Enough / Depends / On
Zoketsu Norman Fischer: The Narrow Roads of Japan
Allen Ginsberg: The Fall of America
Jack Kerouac: Book of Sketches
Joanne Kyger: Again; As Ever; Patzcuaro
David Lehman: The Daily Mirror
Bernadette Mayer: Midwinter’s Day
Michael Rothenberg: Unhurried Vision, The Paris Journals, Narcissus
Ron Silliman: Bart; Xing
Louis MacNeice: Autumn Journal; Xing
Andrew Schelling: The Road to Ocosingo; Two Elk: A High Country Notebook
Joel Sloman: Cuban Journal
Gary Snyder: Earth House Hold
Philip Whalen: Goofbook
John Wieners: 707 Scott Street Robert Crosson: Daybook

== See also ==
- Mildred Seydell
