= Waifs and Strays (poetry collection) =

- Author: Micah Ballard
- Language: English
- Publisher: City Lights
- Publication date: September 2011
- Pages: 100 pp
- ISBN: 978-0-87286-544-0

Waifs and Strays is a book of poetry by Micah Ballard. The book was first published in 2011 by City Lights and is part of the City Lights Spotlight Series. Waifs and Strays was a finalist for the California Book Award.

== Reception ==
Reviewing the book, Jeffrey Cyphers Wright from The Brooklyn Rail stated that "highly stylized, fairly experimental, and original, the poems rely on sequential 'disruption' underpinned by a solidly smoldering focus. The thematic transference of significance becomes a mantra of sustenance amidst an arranged wilderness, 'It is all imagined, anchored by the word.'" Publishers Weekly further acknowledged the poet's style: "Though raised in Baton Rouge, La., Ballard now seems energetically tied to San Francisco, since his offhand intensities, fiercely casual stance, quick free verse, and colloquial mysticism draw so frequently on two great sources of Bay Area poetics, the prophetic concentration of Robert Duncan and the extroversion of the beats."
