= Chapman H. Hyams =

Stockbroker, art collector and philanthropist

Chapman Henry Hyams Sr. (July 21, 1838 – April 19, 1923) was an American stockbroker, art collector, and philanthropist.

== Biography ==
Chapman H. Hyams was born in Charleston, South Carolina on July 21, 1838.

He died in New Orleans on April 19, 1923.

== Family ==
On April 26, 1893, Hyams' son, Chapman Henry Hyams Jr., married Violet Victoria Hildreth. Their wedding took place in New York City. On August 21, 1899, their son, Chapman Henry, 3rd, was born in New London, Connecticut.

== New Orleans Museum of Art ==
When the New Orleans Museum of Art opened in 1911 Hyams loaned over 20 paintings for the opening, some of which were later donated outright.

=== Donated paintings ===
The donated paintings include the following:

- Woodland Scene by Jean-Baptiste-Camille Corot
- Whisperings of Love (Les murmures de l'Amour) by William-Adolphe Bouguereau
- The Snake Charmer (Charmeur de Serpents) by Jean-Léon Gérôme
- Turkish Bashi Bazouk Mercenaries Playing Chess in a Market Place also by Gérôme
- The Cardinal's Friendly Chat by Jehan Georges Vibert
- Shrine of Venus by Sir Lawrence Alma-Tadema
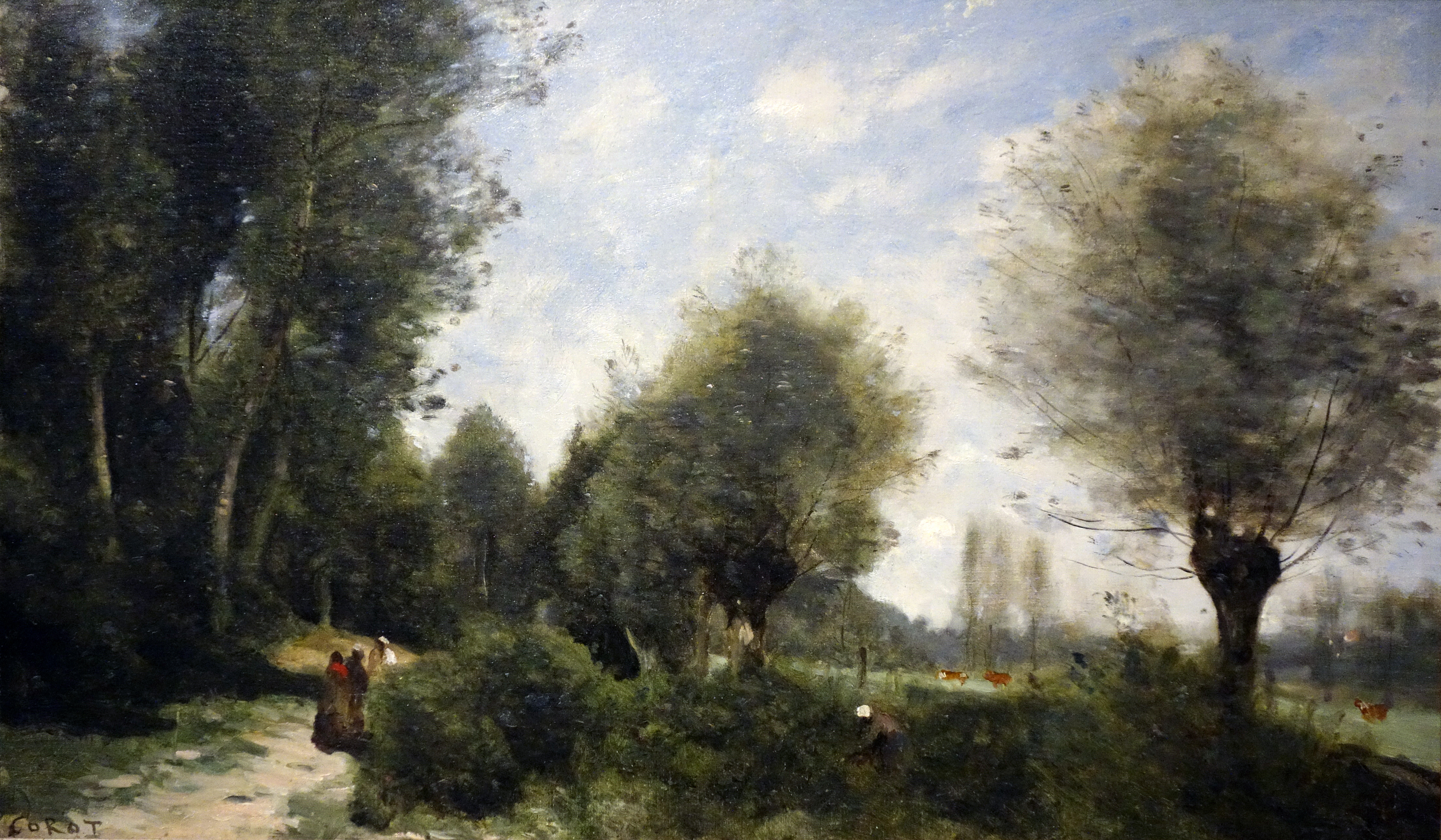
Woodland Scene

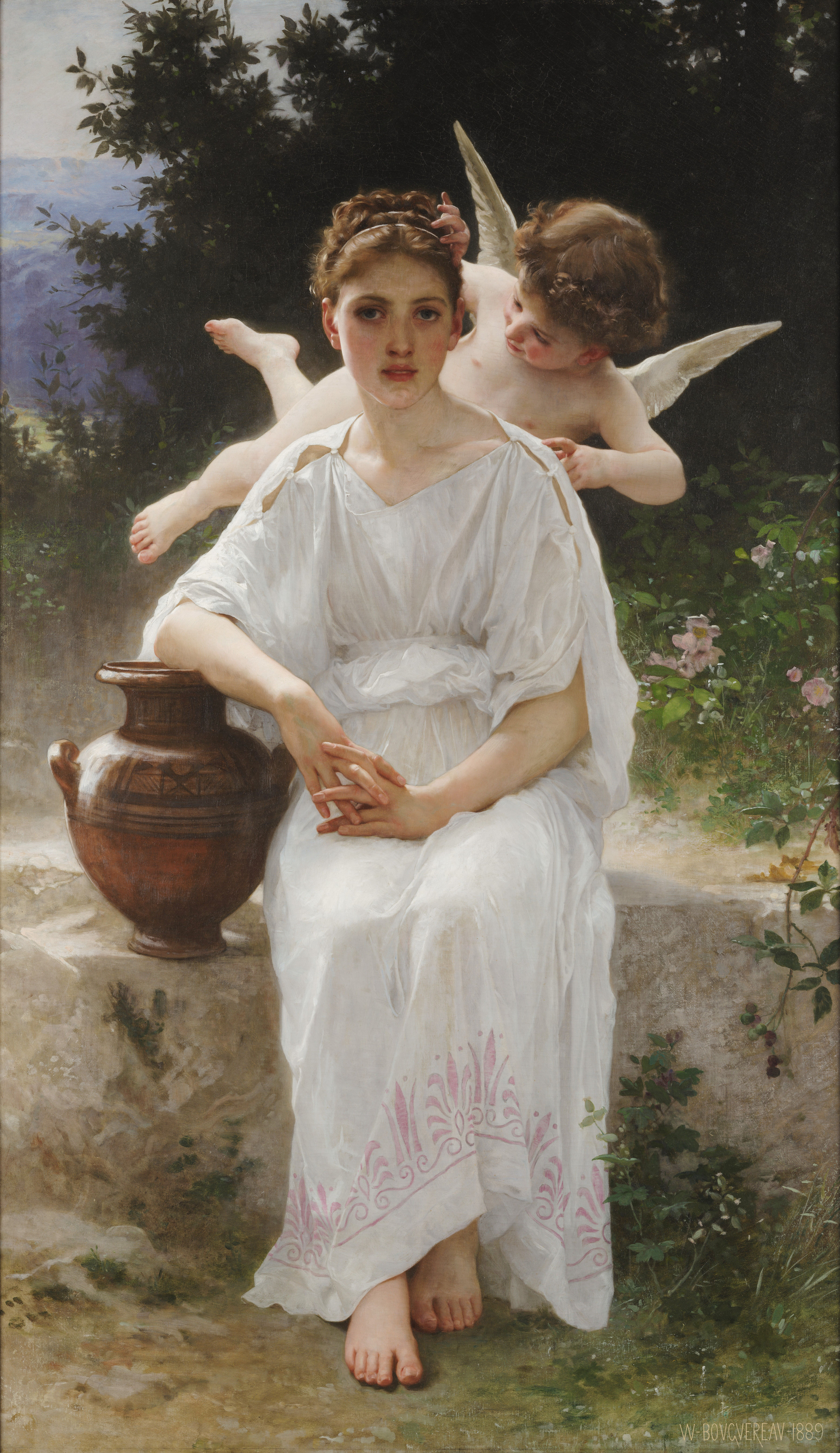
Whisperings of Love

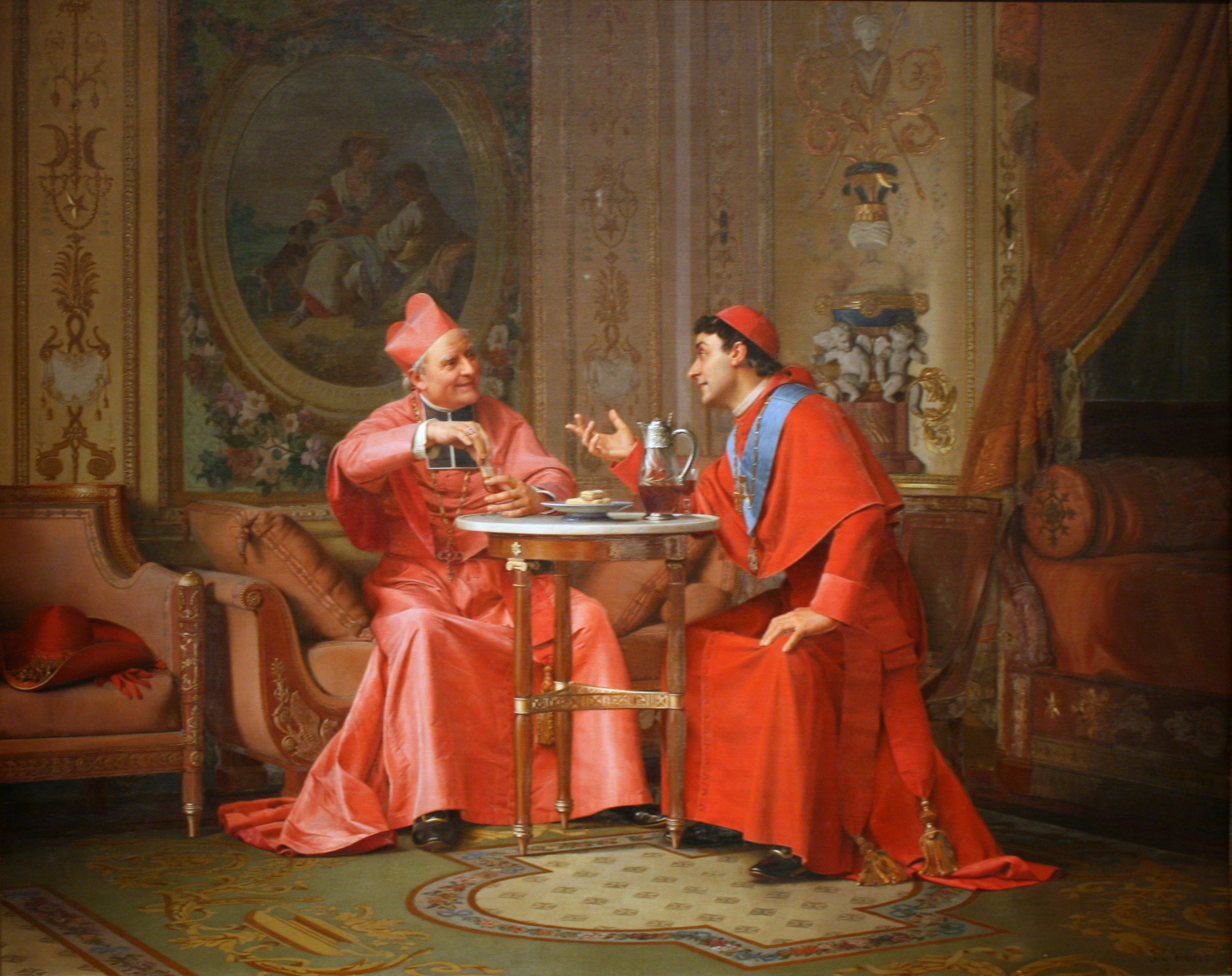
The Cardinals' Friendly Chat

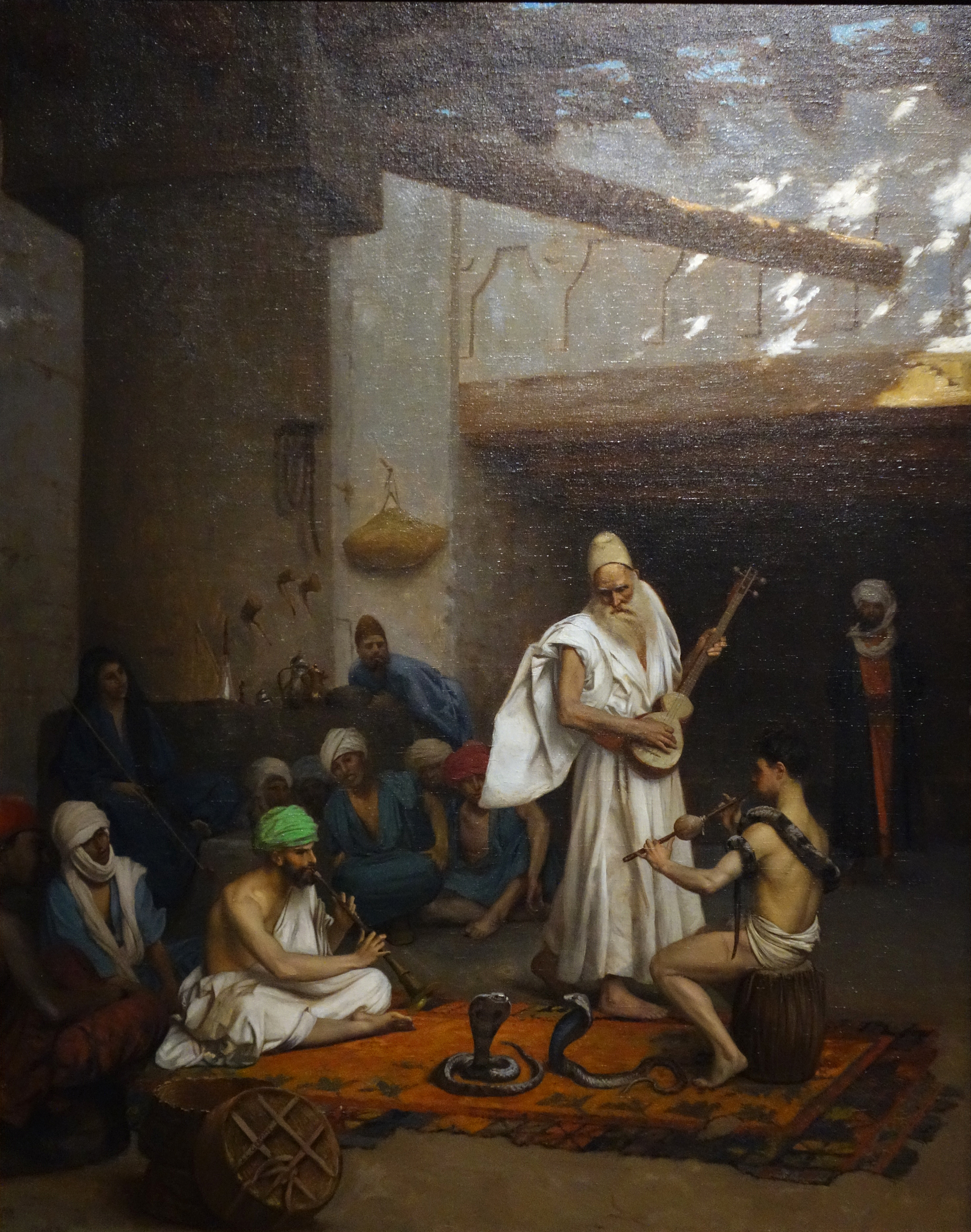
The Snake Charmer

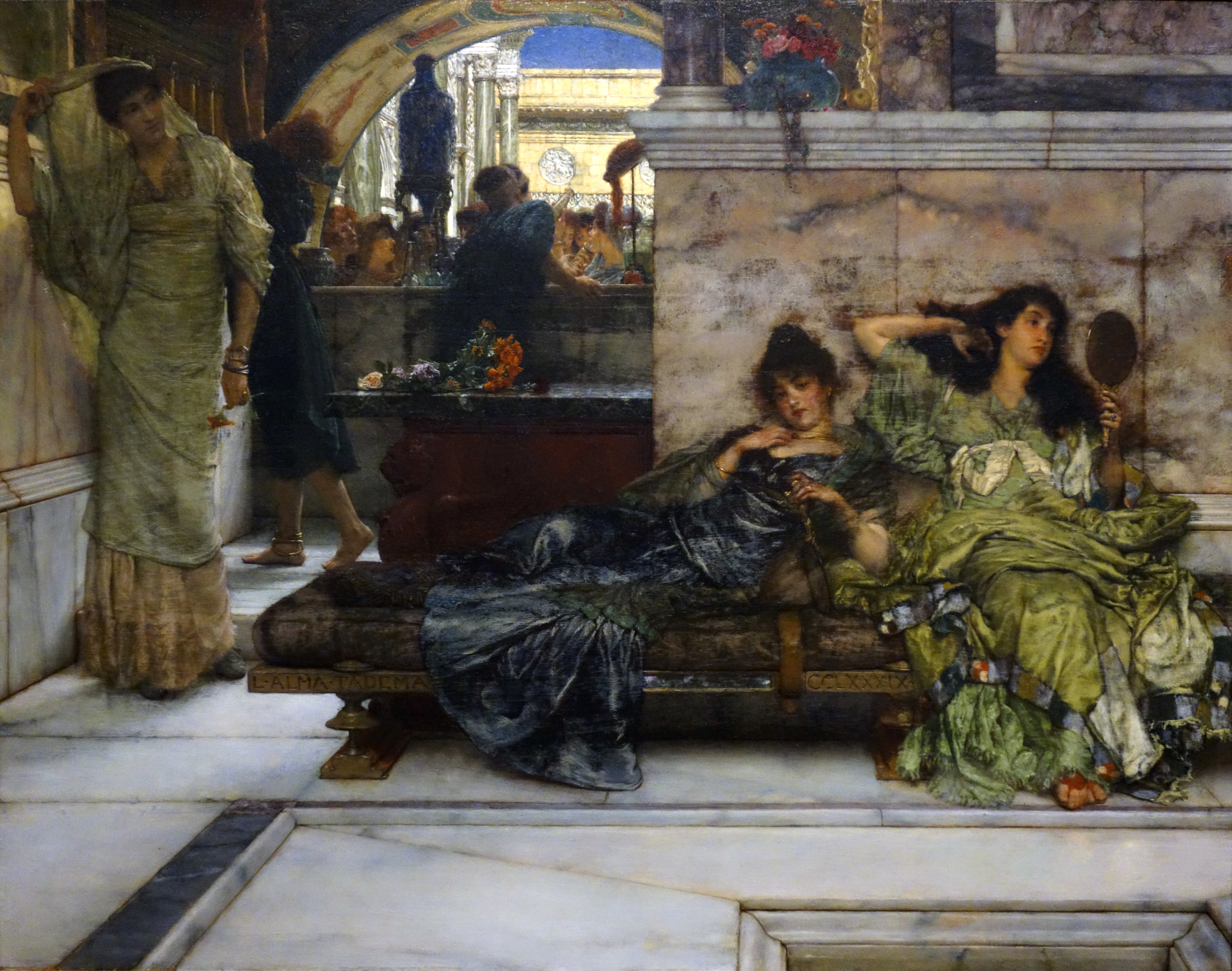
Shrine of Venus

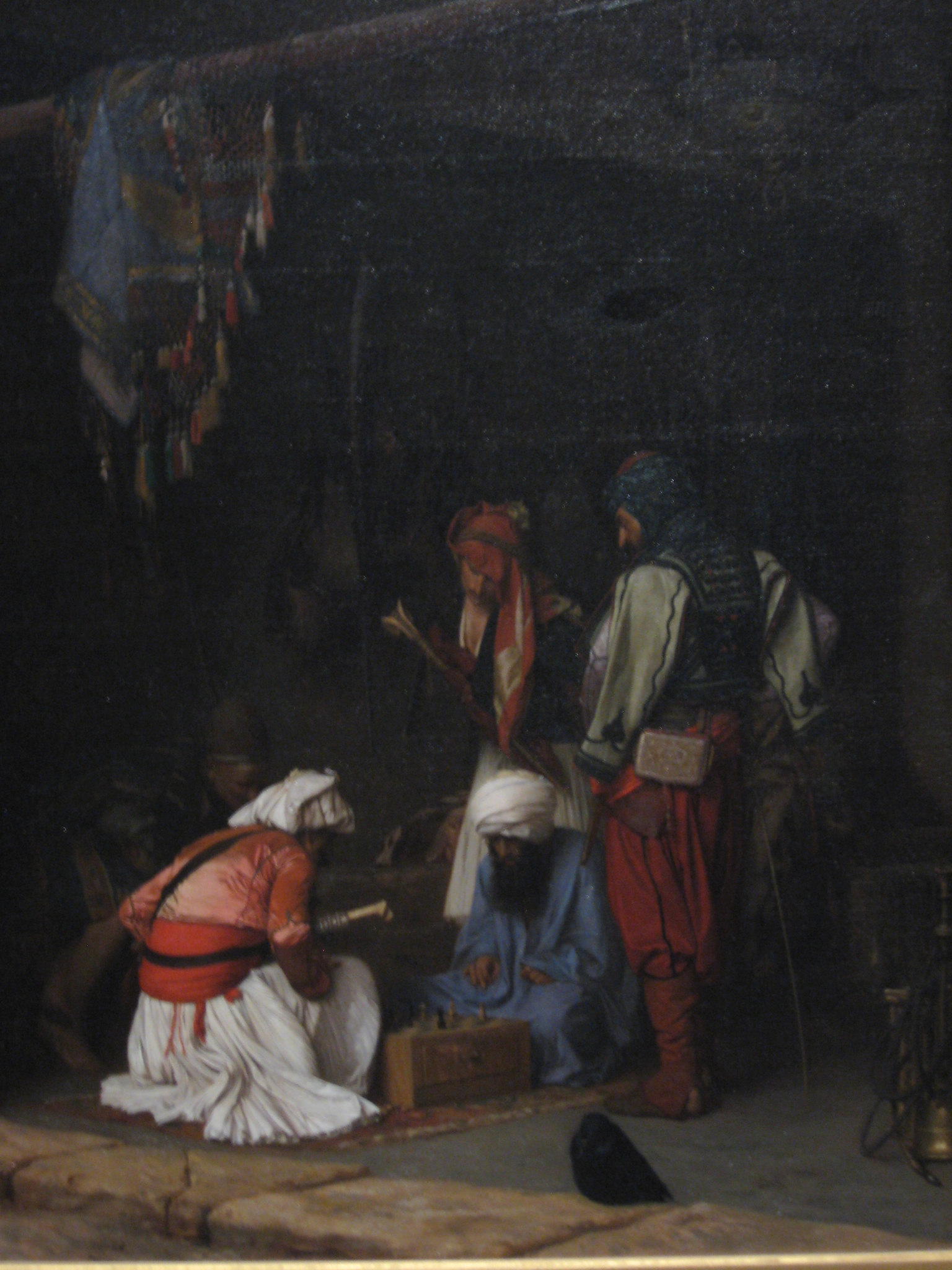
Turkish Bashi Bazouk Mercenaries Playing Chess in a Market Place

== Mausoleum ==
Hyams had a mausoleum built to house family remains in the Metairie Cemetery, New Orleans, the marble statuary monument to his sisters based on William Wetmore Story's Angel of Grief. Hyams was eventually interred in the family mausoleum himself. The mausoleum, designed by Favrot & Livaudais is in the style of a Greek temple with Ionic columns on all sides, and a pediment, with Hyams' name below. The interior is illuminated by four blue stained glass windows, with floral theme.

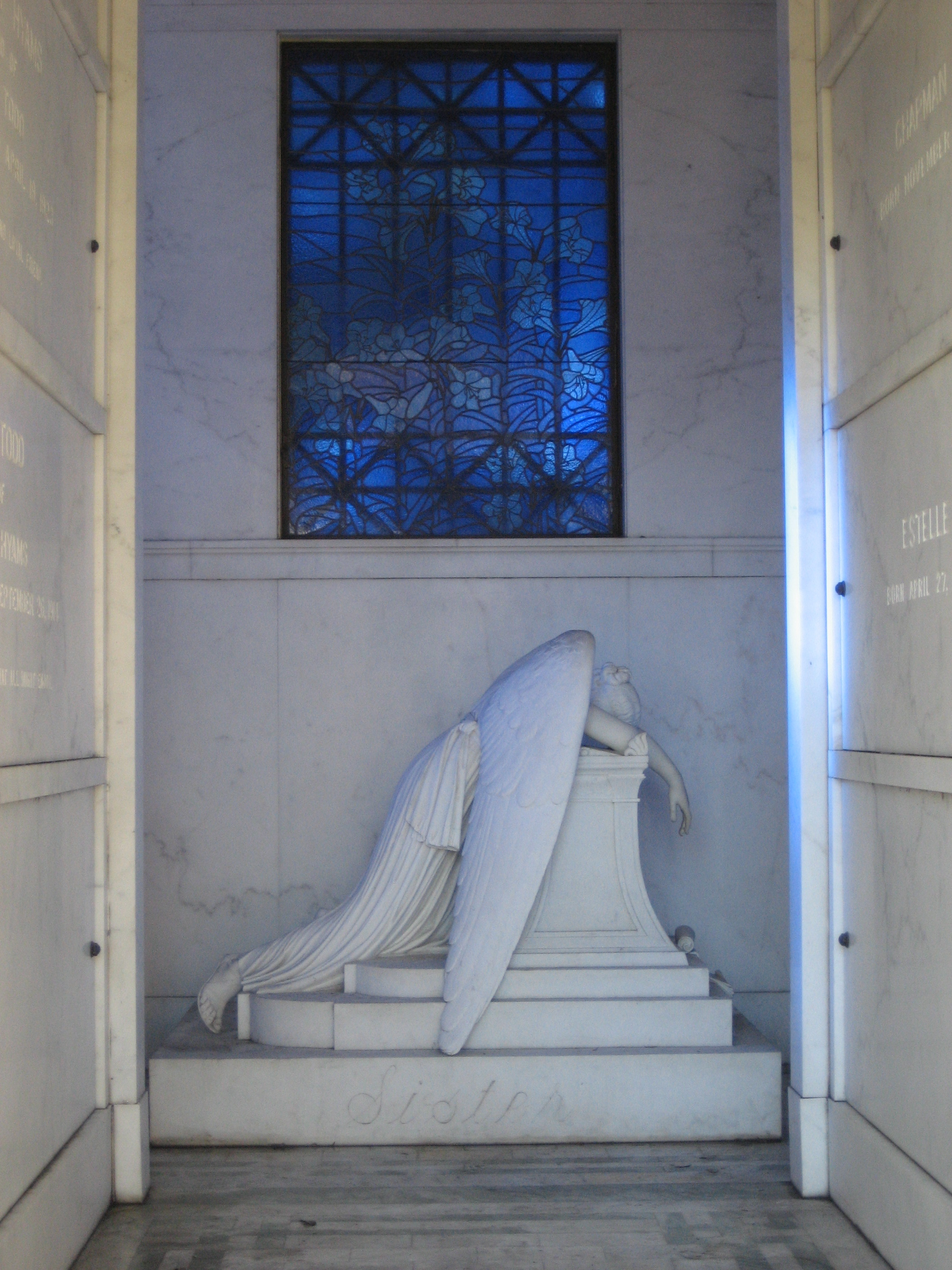
The statuary under a window

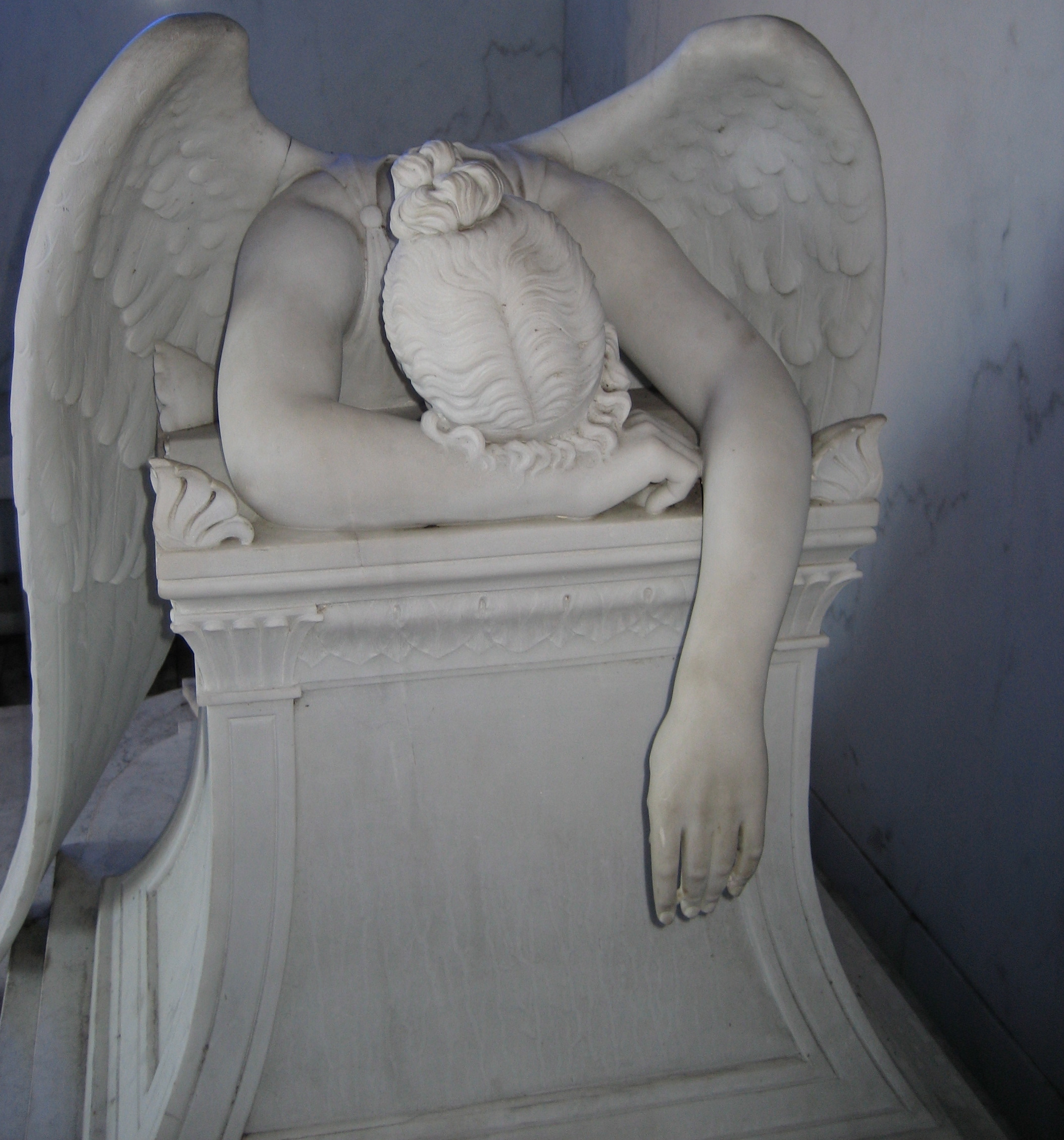
Front view

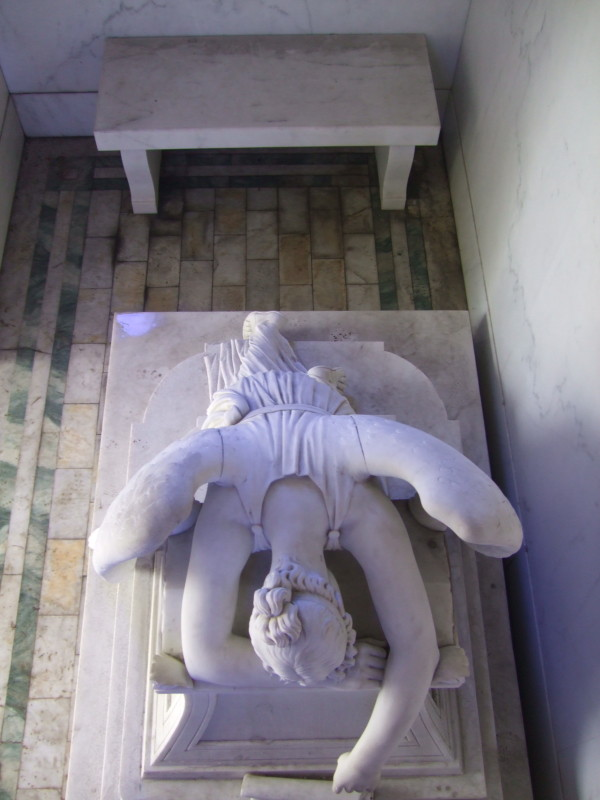
From above

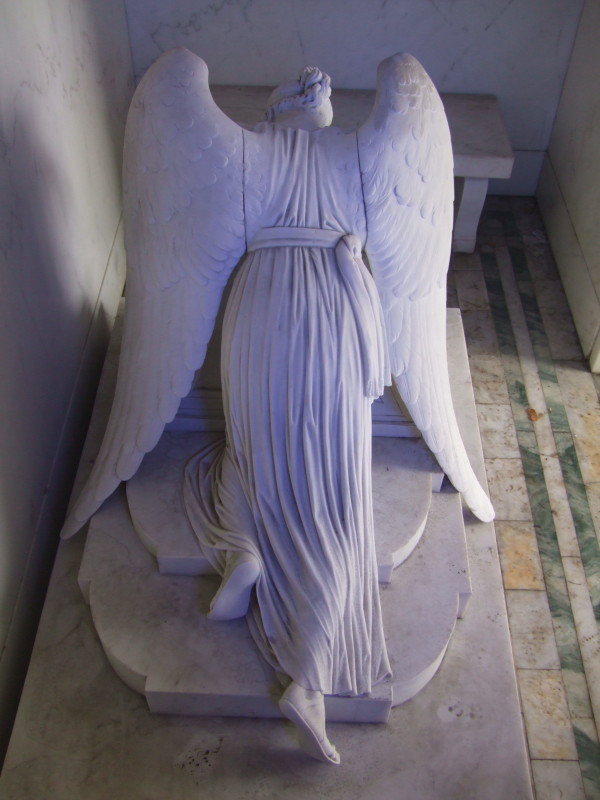
Rear view
