= Canal Bank and Trust =

Commercial bank in New Orleans, Louisiana, US

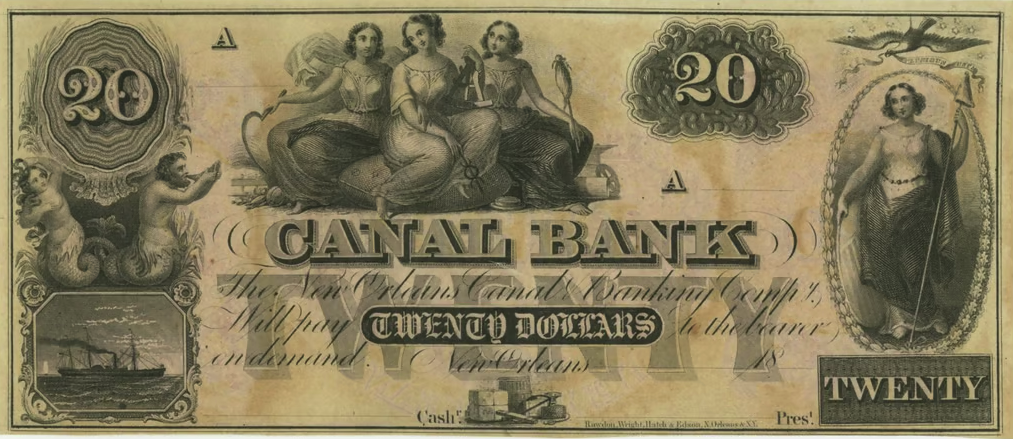
- 1850s Canal Bank $20 banknote
- Industry: Commercial banking
- Headquarters: New Orleans, Louisiana, United States

Canal Bank and Trust was a commercial bank in New Orleans, Louisiana.

== History ==
Canal Bank and Trust was formed by the 1919 merger of Commercial Trust and Savings Bank and Canal Bank. It was renamed Canal Bank and Trust Company on January 1, 1926.

== Presidents ==
- George Ogden (1831-1841)
- Glendy Burke (1841-1849)
- Rathbone (1859?)
- George B. Jonas (1866?-1877)
- Joseph Chandler Morris (1877-??)

== Mergers and acquisition time-line ==
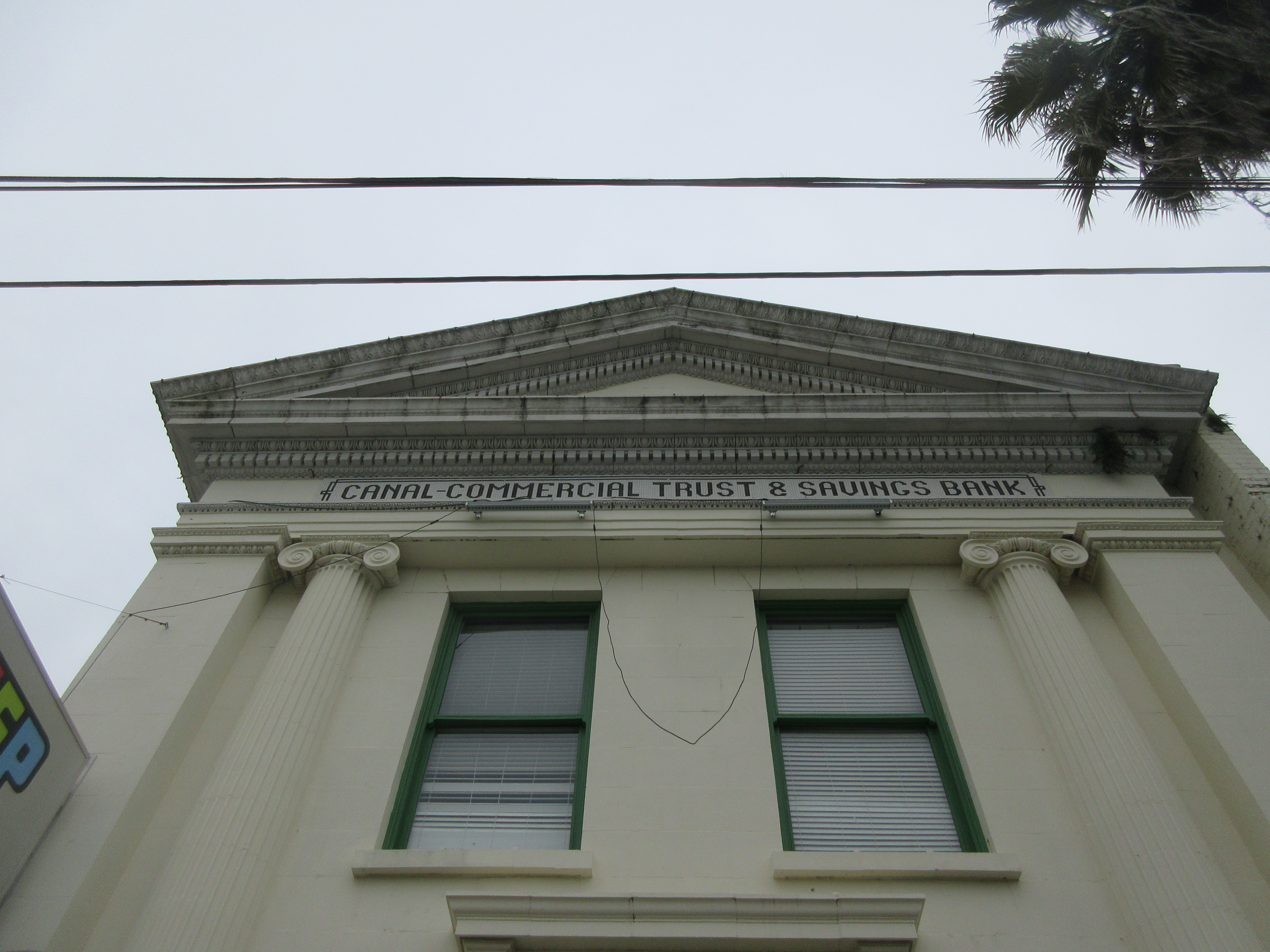
Legacy "Canal-Commercial Trust and Savings Bank" signage on O.C. Haley Boulevard

- New Orleans Canal and Banking Company, March 5, 1831.
- Canal Bank of New Orleans, November 22, 1895
- Canal Bank and Trust Company, August 11, 1903
- Canal-Louisiana Bank and Trust Company, October, 1905
- Canal Bank and Trust Company, January 1, 1914
- Canal-Commercial Trust and Savings Bank, 1919
- Canal Bank and Trust Company, January 1, 1926

== Archive ==
The Canal Bank and Trust papers are archived at Tulane University.
