= Bootstrap Productions =

Tyler Doherty & Derek Fenner, 2006

Bootstrap Productions is a nonprofit collaborative arts and literary organization based in Lowell, Massachusetts, which is primarily known for its publishing arm, Bootstrap Press, a small-press publisher of contemporary experimental writing.

Begun in Boulder, Colorado in the winter of 1999, Bootstrap Productions originally formed as a parent organization combining Bootstrap Press, founded by Ryan Gallagher and Derek Fenner, and The @tached Document, a literary arts journal begun by Jeff Chester, Derek Fenner, and Todd McCarthy.

Both Derek Fenner and Ryan Gallagher are MFA graduates of Naropa University's Jack Kerouac School of Disembodied Poetics.

== Bootstrap Press ==
Bootstrap Press is a project of Bootstrap Productions which has published such books as David Michalski's Cosmos & Damian, Andrew Schelling's Two Elk: A High County Notebook, and the poetry collection For the Time Being: The Bootstrap Book of Poetic Journals.

Bootstrap Productions has published 8 books, 3 anthologies, 5 chapbooks, and 2 CDs in the past six years.
