= John Wieners =

American poet

Wieners in New York, 1985

John Joseph Wieners (January 6, 1934 – March 1, 2002) was an American poet.

== Early life ==
Born in Milton, Massachusetts, Wieners attended St. Gregory Elementary School in Dorchester, Massachusetts, and Boston College High School. From 1950 to 1954, he studied at Boston College, where he earned his A.B. On September 11, 1954, he heard Charles Olson read at the Charles Street Meeting House on Beacon Hill during Hurricane Edna. He decided to enroll at Black Mountain College where he studied under Olson and Robert Duncan from 1955 to 1956. In 1957 he took a job sweeping floors at a popular Beat hangout in North Beach, where he joined the artistic community in the city. There he became close to painter Robert LaVigne and the collage artist Wallace Berman who was involved in the Beat Movement. He then worked as an actor and stage manager at the Poet's Theater in Cambridge, and began to edit Measure, releasing three issues over the next several years.

From 1958 to 1960, Wieners lived in San Francisco and actively participated in the San Francisco Poetry Renaissance. The Hotel Wentley Poems was published in 1958, when Wieners was twenty-four. Subsequently, he was a contributor to Donald Allen's seminal New American Poetry anthology.

Wieners returned to Boston in 1960 and was committed to a psychiatric hospital. In 1961, he moved to New York City and worked as an assistant bookkeeper at Eighth Street Books from 1962 to 1963, living on the Lower East Side with Herbert Huncke. He went back to Boston in 1963, employed as a subscriptions editor for Jordan Marsh department stores until 1965. Wieners' second book, Ace of Pentacles, was published in 1964.

In 1965, after traveling with Olson to the Spoleto Festival and the Berkeley Poetry Conference, he enrolled in the Graduate Program at SUNY Buffalo. He worked as a teaching fellow under Olson, then as an endowed Chair of Poetics, staying until 1967, with Pressed Wafer coming out the same year. In 1968, he signed the "Writers and Editors War Tax Protest" pledge, vowing to refuse tax payments in protest against the Vietnam War. In the spring of 1969, Wieners was again institutionalized, and wrote Asylum Poems.

Nerves was released in 1970, containing work from 1966 to 1970. In the early 1970s, Wieners became active in education and publishing cooperatives, political action committees, and the gay liberation movement. He also moved into an apartment at 44 Joy Street on Beacon Hill, where he lived for the next thirty years.

In 1975, Behind the State Capitol or Cincinnati Pike was published, a magnum opus of "Cinema decoupages; verses, abbreviated prose insights." For the next ten years, he published rarely and remained largely out of the public eye. In 1985, he was a Guggenheim Fellow.

== Later life ==
Black Sparrow Press released two collections edited by Raymond Foye: Selected Poems: 1958-1984 and Cultural Affairs in Boston, in 1986 and 1988 respectively. A previously unpublished journal by Wieners came out in 1996, entitled The Journal of John Wieners was to be called 707 Scott Street for Billie Holliday 1959, documenting his life in San Francisco around the time of The Hotel Wentley Poems.

At the Guggenheim Museum in 1999, Wieners gave one of his last public readings, celebrating an exhibit by the painter Francesco Clemente. A collaboration between the two, Broken Women, was also published.

Wieners died on March 1, 2002, at Massachusetts General Hospital in Boston, having collapsed a few days previously after an evening attending a party with his friend and publisher Charley Shively.

== Works ==
Wieners was a Beat poet, and his poems combined accounts of sexual and drug-related experimentations. Like most Beat writers, Wieners included improvised influences of jazz in the lyrical structure of his works.

As a Beat writer, he used his writings to express his opinions on certain issues, including poverty and the working class. His poem, Children of the Working Class expresses the horror of children working intense jobs in order to help out their families and how these jobs affect them. Wieners' poem can be compared to William Blake's poem The Chimney Sweeper, in which they both call out the horrors of child labor.

Though a Beat writer, he isn't well known. In regards to Wieners, Allen Ginsberg said, "Wieners, in a way, is one of the greatest poets around, or, certainly, the most Romantic, and doomed, poet around, compared to everyone else, and he's not well known."

== Legacy ==
Kidnap Notes Next, a collection of poems and journal entries edited by Jim Dunn, was published posthumously in 2002.

A Book of Prophecies was published in 2007 from Bootstrap Press. The manuscript was discovered in the Kent State University archive's collection by poet Michael Carr. It was a journal written by Wieners in 1971, and opens with a poem titled 2007.

His papers are held at the University of Delaware.

In September 2015, City Lights Bookstore & Publishers released Stars Seen in Person: Selected Journals of John Wieners, which offers selections from four of Wieners' previously unpublished journals written between 1955 and 1969. These journals capture a post-war bohemian world that no longer exists, seen through the prism of Wieners' sense of glamour.

In October 2015, Wave Books published Supplication which was touted, at the time of its publication, as the first comprehensive selection of Wieners' poetry to have been published in 15 years.

In 2017 the international quarterly Four by Two magazine, in collaboration with Raymond Foye, ran a series of previously unpublished letters from Wieners circa the 1950s and 1960s, to figures including Diane di Prima and Michael Rumaker. Several rarely seen poems from the same period were also included.

== Books ==
- Wieners, John. Stars Seen in Person. City Lights. San Francisco. 2015. ISBN 9780872866683
- Wieners, John. A Book of Prophecies. Bootstrap Press. Lowell, Mass. 2007. ISBN 978-0-9779975-4-1
- Charters, Ann (ed.). The Portable Beat Reader. Penguin Books. New York. 1992. ISBN 0-670-83885-3 (hc); ISBN 0-14-015102-8 (pbk)
- Reed, Jeremy. It Had to Be You: The Poetry of John Wieners (Elysium Press, 2004)
- "John Wieners." Poetry Foundation. Poetry Foundation
- "Allen Ginsberg on John Wieners." Allen Ginsberg Project. Allen Ginsberg Project
