= Judith Copithorne =

Canadian concrete and visual poet (1939–2025)

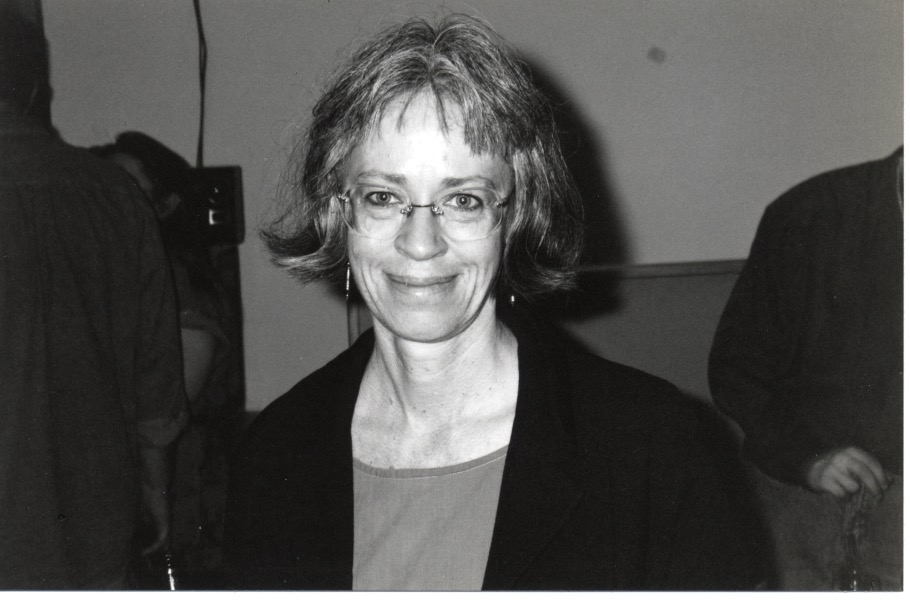
- Born: August 5, 1939; Vancouver, British Columbia, Canada
- Died: May 15, 2025 (aged 85)
- Education: University of British Columbia
- Occupation: Poet
- Known for: Concrete poetry, visual poetry
- Movement: Avant-garde poetry

Judith Copithorne (August 5, 1939 – May 15, 2025) was a Canadian concrete and visual poet.

== Life and career ==
Judith Copithorne was born in Vancouver, British Columbia on August 5, 1939, where she grew up in an artistic family. She started writing and drawing at an early age and by the time she attended University of British Columbia, she had already established a unique artistic style. At UBC, she studied under prominent figures such as Warren Tallman and George Woodcock.

In the early 1960s, she became acquainted with an informal group of "Downtown Poets," including writers such as Gladys (Maria) Hindmarch, John Newlove, bill bissett, Gerry Gilbert, Maxine Gadd and Roy Kiyooka, centered around the Vancouver venues of Sound Gallery, Motion Studio and Intermedia Press. The Downtown Poets were involved in more radical experimentation than the established TISH group of the University of British Columbia, represented by poets such as George Bowering, Fred Wah, Frank Davey and Daphne Marlatt. The appellation "Downtown Poets" was invented by UBC professor Warren Tallman to distinguish the San Francisco Renaissance-influenced UBC writers from the homegrown Canadian poets.

Judith Copithorne worked with concrete poetry and other types of experimental writing in prose, poetry and visual poetry. Her core themes include domestic space and community. Copithorne wrote between text and visual forms, with early work combining text with abstract line drawings, called Poem-drawings. In the Introduction to the anthology Four Parts Sand, she described her work in the following manner:

"Poem-drawings are an attempt to fuse visual and verbal perceptions. The eye sees, the ear hears, movement is felt kinaesthetically throughout the body and all these sensations are perceived in heart, belly and brain. The aims are the same as in other forms of literature and art: concentration and communication, delight, immersion in the present moment."

Copithorne published over 40 books, chapbooks, and ephemeral items; a bibliography of her work was published by jwcurry in the March, 2009 issue #400 of 1 cent. She has been published in blewointment and Ganglia. Her work was featured in numerous gallery exhibitions and is widely influential for multiple generations of poets living and working today.

Copithorne died on May 15, 2025, at the age of 85.

== Selected works ==
- Returning (Returning Press, 1965)
- Meandering (Returning Press, 1967)
- Release: Poem-Drawings (Bau-Xi Gallery, 1969)
- Rain (Ganglia Press, 1969)
- Runes (Coach House Books/Intermedia, 1971)
- Miss Tree's Pillow Book (Intermedia/Returning Press, 1971)
- Until Now (Heshe&ItWorks, 1971)
- Heart's Tide (Vancouver Community Press Writing Series #8, 1972)
- History's Wife: a sculpture (Community Cultural Feedback Project, 1972)
- Arrangements (Intermedia Press, 1973)
- Albion's Rose Blooms to Calypso Beat (Ganglia Press, 1985)
- A Light Character (Coach House Books, 1985)
- Third Day of Fast (Silver Birch Press, 1987)
- Horizon (Pangen Subway Ritual, 1992)
- Carbon Dioxide (Silver Birch Press, 1992)
- For my ancestors (Curvd H&z, 1994)
- Tern: (Returning Press, 2000)
- Brackets & Boundaries (Returning Press, 2012)
- see lex ions (Xerolage 62; Xexoxial Editions, 2015)
- Phases / Phrases (Trainwreck Press, 2019)
- Another Order: Selected Works (Talonbooks, 2023)

== Anthologies ==
- Spanish Fleye, David W.Harris, ed. (Fleye Press, 1966)
- West Coast Seen, Jim Philips Brown, ed. (Talonbooks, 1969)
- The Cosmic Chef, bpNichol, ed. (Oberon Press, 1970)
- I Am A Sensation, Gerry Goldberg & George Wright, eds. (McClelland & Stewart, 1971)
- New Directions in Canadian Poetry, John Robert Colombo, ed. (Holt, Rinehart and Winston of Canada, 1971)
- Four Parts Sand, Michael Macklem, ed. (Oberon Press, 1972)
- Earle Birney, Bruce Nesbitt, ed. (McGraw-Hill Ryerson, 1973)
- a book of process, Eldon Garnet, ed. (La Club Foot & Rumblestill Press, 1973)
- W)here?: The Other Canadian Poetry, Eldon Garnet, ed. (Press Porcepic, 1974)
- concrete poetry?, editor unknown (privately published, 1976?)
- The Oxford Book of Canadian Literature in English, Margaret Atwood, ed. (Oxford University Press, 1982)
- The Last Blewointment Anthology, Volume I, Bill Bissett, ed. (Nightwood Editions, 1985)
- Vancouver Poetry, Allan Safarik, ed. (Polestar Press, 1986)
- Paging Peggy Lefler, jwcurry, ed. (privately published, 1993)
- wit out, Billy Little, ed. (Dojo Publications, 1999)
- radiant danse uv being: a potic portrait of bill bissett, Jeff Pew & Steven Roxborough, eds. (Nightwood Editions, 2006)
- Holy Beep!, Natalie Zina Walschots, ed. (Filling Station & No Press, 2007)
- Postmodern Decadence, Gregory Betts, ed. (Semantic Press, 2008)
- The Art of Typewriting, Marvin Sackner & Ruth Sackner, eds. (Thames & Hudson, 2015)
- Schreib/ Maschinen/ Kunst, Marvin Sackner & Ruth Sackner, eds. (Sieveking Verlag, 2015)
- concrete is porous, Bill Bissett & Hart Broudy, eds. (The Secret Handshake Gallery, 2028; reprinted Ottaa Versefest 2019; reprinted Common Ground Art Gallery, 2019)
- Judith: Women Making Visual Poetry: a 21st Century Anthology, Amanda Earl, ed. (Timglaset Editions, 2021)
- After Words: Visual and Experimental Poetry in Little Magazines and Small Presses 1960-2025, Steve Clay & M.C.Kinniburgh, eds. (Granary Books, 2025)
- LMNTS: fractionating 6 decades of canadian extralinearature, Daniel Bradley, Hart Broudy, jcurry & Marshall Hryciuk, eds. (Nietzsche's Brolly, 2025)

== See also ==
- Canadian literature
- Canadian poetry
- List of Canadian poets
