= Jamie Reid (poet) =

Canadian writer (1941-2015)

Jamie Reid (April 10, 1941 – June 25, 2015) was a Canadian writer, activist, and arts organizer. He was born in Timmins, Ontario and came of age on the west coast of Canada.

Reid co-founded the influential poetry journal TISH in Vancouver in 1961 with George Bowering, Frank Davey, David Dawson, and Fred Wah. He published his first collection of poems, The Man Whose Path Was on Fire, in 1969. A short time later he joined the Communist Party of Canada (Marxist-Leninist) and stopped writing for 25 years in favour of political activism "because [he] didn’t have a way of working the language of politics into the language of poetry."

Reid returned to poetry and cultural criticism in the late 1980s, with a special interest in jazz expressed in many of his works. He lived in North Vancouver with his wife, the painter Carol Reid, since returning to Vancouver in 1990, and their home was a hub of literary activism and activity, including the publication of his local/international avant-garde magazine DaDaBaBy. Reid also edited and contributed to the intergenerational Vancouver literary journal Tads (1996-2001) through which Reid, George Bowering, Renee Rodin, and George Stanley mentored younger writers, including Thea Bowering, Wayde Compton, Reg Johanson, Ryan Knighton, Jason le Heup, Cath Morris, Chris Turnbull, and Karina Vernon.

== Bibliography ==
=== Poetry ===
- The Man Whose Path Was on Fire (1969)
- Prez: Homage to Lester Young (1994)
- Mad Boys (1997)
- I. Another. The Space Between: Selected Poems (2004)
- A Temporary Stranger: Homages, Poems and Recollections (2017)

=== Biography ===
- Diana Krall: The Language of Love (2002)
- Chris Isaak: Wicked Games (2006)
