= Warren Tallman =

Canadian literary critic (1921–1994)

Warren Tallman (17 November 1921 – 1 July 1994) was an American-born poetry professor who influenced the Vancouver Tish poets.

== History ==
Born in Seattle, Tallman was raised in Tumwater, Washington. He attended the University of California, Berkeley on the G.I. Bill, writing dissertations on Henry James and Joseph Conrad. There he met Ellen King; they married in 1951.

In 1956, Tallman and his wife accepted teaching jobs in the English department at the University of British Columbia, helped Earle Birney and Roy Daniells to organize the creative writing department. In 1963, they hosted a poetry conference attended by Denise Levertov, Charles Olson, Allen Ginsberg, Robert Duncan, Margaret Avison, Robert Creeley, and Philip Whalen, Daphne Marratt. The Tallman home itself also served as a poetry enclave of sorts. It was in the Tallman home that Jack Spicer gave some of his lectures. Two years later, they held another poetry conference in Berkeley, California.

Tallman was sometimes criticized for turning the Vancouver poetry circle into a California branch plant. Tallman embraced the Black Mountain school approach to poetry, but also showed the influence of the Beats, the New American Poets and the Language Poets. Among the Canadian poets he is said to have influenced are George Bowering, Lionel Kearns, Frank Davey, Jamie Reid, Fred Wah, bill bissett, Stan Persky and Howard White.

== Selected bibliography ==
- The Poetics of the New American Poetry New York: Grove, 1973. ISBN 0-394-17801-7 (edited with Donald Allen)
- Godawful Streets of Man Toronto: Coach House, 1978.
- In the Midst Vancouver: Talonbooks, 1992.
