= Dennis Reid =

Canadian curator and art historian (1943–2023)

- Born: Dennis Richard Reid; January 3, 1943; Hamilton, Ontario, Canada
- Died: April 27, 2023 (aged 80); Toronto, Ontario, Canada
- Education: University of Toronto
- Occupations: Art historian Curator
- Spouse: Alison

Dennis Richard Reid CM (January 3, 1943 – April 27, 2023) was a Canadian curator and art historian whose exhibitions and catalogues were praised by peers as "impressive" and scholarship "coherent" and "commendable".

== Education and career ==
Dennis Richard Reid was born in Hamilton, Ontario on January 3, 1943. He received his Honours B.A. and M.A. in art history from the University of Toronto. In the early 1960s, he helped Stan Bevington found Coach House Press in Toronto In 1967, he was hired by Dr. Jean Boggs at the National Gallery of Canada as an assistant curator; subsequently he became Curator of Post-Confederation Canadian Art, and worked there until 1979. In 1977, he was hired as a lecturer in art history at the University of Toronto (he taught Canadian art), becoming a full professor in 1987, until he retired in 2018. From 1979 until 2010, he worked as Curator of Historical Canadian Art and then Curator of Canadian Art at the Art Gallery of Ontario, later serving in other positions at the gallery such as Chief Curator and Director of Collections and Research.

== Curatorial work ==
Reid organized, co-organized, wrote catalogues or contributed essays to numerous exhibitions on subjects such as the art of the Group of Seven (1970), Toronto Painting (1972), Canadian Victorian Painting (1980), A. Y. Jackson (1982), Arthur Lismer (1985), Lawren Harris (1985), Lucius Richard O'Brien (1990) called "magisterial", Krieghoff (1999), and Tom Thomson (2002) and curated exhibitions on a broad range of other artists and subjects in the area of late 19th and 20th century Canadian art such as 20th Century Canadian Painting (1981), co-curated with Jessica Bradley, for tour in Japan: Tokyo, Sapporo and Oita City. Canadian Art magazine called him the curator with "the gracious eye" for his exhibition of the Art Gallery of Ontario's permanent exhibition of the Canadian collection.

== Publications ==
Reid was the author of numerous publications on Canadian art, including A Concise History of Canadian Painting, first published in 1973, with subsequent editions in 1988 and 2012. Reid wrote in the book about Canadian painting through 1965, beginning in the French colonial period. The second edition covered events through 1980, with a new long chapter covering the intervening fifteen years that saw developing in Canada a tremendous interest in other art forms, and an apparent waning of interest in painting. Reid traced the contributions of established artists who produced steadily in the period as well as new arrivals on the scene who have since joined the ranks of leading Canadian artists. A third edition was even more inclusive and illustrated with large, glossy, colour reproductions.

Among Reid's publications were The MacCallum Bequest & The Mr and Mrs H. R. Jackman Gift (1969); The Group of Seven (1970); A Bibliography of the Group of Seven (1971); Toronto Painting: 1953-1965 (1972); Bertram Brooker 1888-1955 (1973); Our Own Country Canada (1980) considered "groundbreaking"; Alberta Rhythm: The later work of A.Y. Jackson (1982); Canadian Jungle: The Later Work of Arthur Lismer (1985); Atma buddhi manas: The Later Work of Lawren S. Harris (1985); Collector's Canada: Selections from a Toronto Private Collection (1988); Lucius R. O'Brien: Visions of Victorian Canada (1990); and Krieghoff: Images of Canada (1999). Reid also collaborated on publications such as Visual Art: The Michael Snow Project and Michael Snow Project: Music/Sound: Music/Sound 1948-1993 (both 1994), and Greg Curnoe: Life and Stuff (2001); and many other catalogues as well as co-authoring, with Charles C. Hill, Tom Thomson (2002).

== Death ==
Reid died from heart failure on April 27, 2023, at the age of 80.

== Honours ==
Reid became a Member of the Order of Canada in 1998. Other awards he received throughout his career include Honorary Fellow of OCAD (the Ontario College of Arts and Design) (2000), an honorary doctorate from the University of Lethbridge (2001), and the Queen Elizabeth II's Golden Jubilee Medal (2002) and Queen's Diamond Jubilee Medal (2012).

== Controversy ==
In 2014, The Vancouver Art Gallery approached Reid to assess the authenticity of ten alleged J. E. H. MacDonald sketches. He felt, at the time, that the pieces were authentic and this claim has since been refuted by other notable experts. Scientific testing and the identification of several pigments used in the pieces also later confirmed that the paintings could not have been painted when J.E.H. MacDonald would have produced them as sketches.
