= George Stanley (poet) =

Canadian poet

George Anthony Stanley (born 1934), is a Canadian poet associated with the San Francisco Renaissance in his early years. In 1971, he became a resident of British Columbia.

He has published many books of poetry, both in San Francisco and in Canada. One of his best-known poems is "Veracruz". A Tall, Serious Girl is his collection of selected poetry. In 2006, he won the Shelley Memorial Award.

Stanley considers T. S. Eliot, Robert Lowell, and Charles Olson important influences on his poetry.

== Life ==
Born and raised in San Francisco, Stanley was part of the San Francisco Renaissance, which included poets such as Jack Spicer, Robert Duncan, and Robin Blaser.

Stanley grew up in the Haight-Ashbury district of San Francisco, attending St. Ignatius College Preparatory. His family was middle-class, Irish, and Catholic. In 1951, he attended the University of San Francisco, but left it to enroll at the University of Utah in Salt Lake City a year later. In 1953, Stanley enlisted in the US Army, where he served until 1956. He then enrolled at the University of California, Berkeley and remained there until 1957. It is then that he met Jack Spicer, who asked Stanley to join his Poetry as Magic workshop, which Spicer taught at San Francisco State College, and which included Robert Duncan, Helen Adam, James Broughton, Joe Dunn, and Jack Gilbert. Stanley's poems started appearing in publications such as J (San Francisco, 1958-1959), Floating Bear (New York, 1960), and Open Space (San Francisco, 1964). His two chapbooks, Tête Rouge/Pony Express Riders and Flowers, were published in 1963 and 1965 respectively. Stanley returned to formal education and received his bachelor's degree in 1969, and his master's degree in 1971, both from San Francisco State University.

In 1971, Stanley moved to Vancouver, British Columbia, where he lived for five years, working on the underground newspaper, The Grape. Publishing house, New Star Books published his first full-length collection, You, in 1974. In 1976, he moved to Terrace in northern B.C., where he worked as an instructor in the English department at Coast Mountain College, a position he held until 1991. In 1992, he moved back to Vancouver to teach at Capilano College. During this period, Stanley published books and was active in Canadian politics, unions, and the alternative media, and served as a board member of the Capilano Press Society, publisher of The Capilano Review. He also edited and contributed to the intergenerational Vancouver literary journal, Tads (1996-2001), through which Stanley, George Bowering, Jamie Reid, and Renee Rodin mentored younger writers such as Thea Bowering, Wayde Compton, Reg Johanson, Ryan Knighton, Jason Le Heup, Chris Turnbull, and Karina Vernon.

Stanley retired from Capilano College in 2003. He currently lives in Vancouver, where he continues to write poetry.

== Books ==
- Flowers (White Rabbit Press, 1965)
- Beyond Love (San Francisco: Dariel Press, 1968)
- You (Poems 1957-67) (Vancouver: New Star Books, 1974)
- The Stick: Poems, 1969-73 (Vancouver: Talonbooks, 1974)
- Opening Day (Fernie, BC: Oolichan Books, 1983)
- Gentle Northern Summer (Vancouver: New Star Books, 1995)
- At Andy's (Vancouver: New Star Books, 2000)
- A Tall, Serious Girl: Selected Poems 1957-2000 (Jamestown, RI: Qua Books, 2003)
- Vancouver: A Poem (Vancouver: New Star Books, 2008)
- After Desire (Vancouver, New Star Books: 2013)
- North of California St.: Selected Poems (Vancouver: New Star Books, 2014)
- West Broadway (Vancouver: New Star Books, 2018)
