= Glenn Goluska =

Canadian book designer and typographer

Glenn Goluska (1947–2011) was a Canadian book designer and typographer. He was born on June 26, 1947, in Chicago and came to Canada as a student at the University of Toronto. He earned a B.A. and then an M.A. in Slavic languages. After graduating, he worked in the United States for a few years. He was employed by the Northwestern University Library where he obtained a Poco Proof press and various typefaces. This was the first set of printing supplies Goluska had obtained and provided him with the means to begin printing. While working his press, Goluska would come across works by the Coach House Press. Goluska took interest in the publishings and would eventually be offered a job by the creator of the Coach House Press, Stan Bevington. Goluska accepted a job offer and moved to Canada to work with Coach House Press for a few years. He left Coach House Press to focus on letterpress printing: his imprints were Imprimerie Dromadaire and Nightshade Press. Here, he utilized his knowledge of wood type which is featured in many of his broadsides. His works can be found at multiple exhibits, including at Massey College’s Robertson Davies Library and the Canadian Fine Press exhibits at the University of Toronto.

Goluska was awarded the Robert R. Reid Award for lifetime achievement or extraordinary contributions to the book arts in Canada by the Alcuin Society in 2011. Goluska had a typeface designed in his honour by Nova Scotia type designer Rod McDonald.

== Personal life ==
Goluska was known for many characteristics including being a procrastinator and perfectionist. He was also known for being intelligent as he skipped fourth grade at the Catholic school he attended as a child before going to Loyola Academy. He found a fascination with typography, reading a lot about the people who pioneered typographic history including Stanley Morison and Harry Carter. Goluska married his high school sweetheart, Anne Bratton, whom he met in high school and married in college.

== Attributed works ==
Several works are attributed to Goluska in the six years he worked at Coach House including: Journal by BpNichol, Sad Phoenician by Robert Kroetsch, Left Hemisphere by Paul Dutton, Right Ear, and Artemis Hates Romance by Sharon Thesen.
