= Sandra Annett =

Canadian film academic

- Occupation: Film scholar

Academic background
- Education: Dalhousie University; Queen's University at Kingston; University of Manitoba
- Thesis: Animating Transcultural Communities: Animation Fandom in North America and East Asia from 1906–2010 (2011)
- Doctoral advisor: Diana Brydon; William Lee; Eugene P. Walz

Academic work
- Discipline: Film studies
- Sub-discipline: Animated film; cinema of Japan
- Institutions: Wilfrid Laurier University

Sandra Annett is a Canadian film academic. She is author of Anime Fan Communities: Transcultural Flows and Frictions (2014) and The Flesh of Animation: Bodily Sensations in Film and Digital Media (2024), as well as co-editor of the academic journal Mechademia. She is Associate Professor of Film Studies at Wilfrid Laurier University.

== Biography ==
Sandra Annett was educated at Dalhousie University, where she got her BA in Honours English in 2004, and at Queen's University at Kingston, where she got her MA in English in 2006. In 2011, she received her PhD in English and Film Studies from the University of Manitoba; her thesis, titled Animating Transcultural Communities: Animation Fandom in North America and East Asia from 1906–2010, was supervised by Diana Brydon, William Lee, and Eugene P. Walz. In 2011, she became part of the Wilfrid Laurier University staff, where she became an Associate Professor of Film Studies. She also became their film studies program's resident specialist in digital and new media studies.

As an academic, Annett specializes in both the relationship between media technology and visual audience perception and in film studies, especially in animated film and the cinema of Japan. In 2014, she published the book Anime Fan Communities: Transcultural Flows and Frictions. Her next book, The Flesh of Animation: Bodily Sensations in Film and Digital Media, which discusses the relationship between animation and interoception, was published in April 2024. She and Frenchy Lunning are the co-editors of Mechademia, an academic journal on Japanese popular culture.

== Publications ==
- Anime Fan Communities: Transcultural Flows and Frictions (2014)
- The Flesh of Animation: Bodily Sensations in Film and Digital Media (2024)
