= Stan Bevington =

Canadian book publisher

- Born: 1943; Edmonton, Alberta, Canada
- Occupation: Publisher
- Years active: 1965-present
- Known for: Coach House Books

Stan Bevington is a Canadian book publisher who founded Coach House Books.

== Life and work ==
In 1965, Stan Bevington, a typesetter, newly transplanted to Toronto from Edmonton, rented an old coach house and installed an antique Challenge Gordon platen press, creating Coach House Press, which introduced Canadians to the early works of writers such as bpNichol, Michael Ondaatje, Margaret Atwood, George Bowering, Di Brandt, Nicole Brossard, Frank Davey, Daphne Marlatt, Ann-Marie MacDonald, David McFadden and Anne Michaels.

Known for its advocacy of the avant-garde and for many author/artist collaborations, Coach House has published more than 500 titles since its inception, and prints more than 200 books a year for other presses, including catalogues for libraries and art galleries.

As printing technology changed over time, Bevington invited collaboration with computer programmers. In 1996, Coach House launched a digital distribution online series of ebooks as part of Bevington's current exploration in virtual publishing.

In the 1970s, Bevington lectured at York University and Visual Studies Workshop, Rochester, and in the 1980s at the Banff Publishing workshops and Radcliffe at Harvard. He was awarded several Canada Council artists' grants during this time and made the Coach House available as a printmaking studio for a number of Canadian artists. One of his own prints is in the Art Gallery of Ontario's permanent collection.

In 1999, Bevington won an Alcuin Society Award for Design for his work on the Toronto in Print catalogue. That same year, Arts Toronto awarded him the William Kilbourn Lifetime Achievement Award, while the Organization of Book Publishers of Ontario gave him the 2005 Janice E. Hanford Small Press Award. In June 2008, Coach House won the Ontario Premier's Award for Excellence in the Arts.

In July 2009, Bevington was appointed a Member of the Order of Canada for his outstanding contribution to Canadian culture.

In May 2010 Stan was awarded Doctor of Fine Arts, honoris causa from NSCAD. He continues to work at Coach House Press.

In March 2012, Bevington was awarded the Robert R. Reid medal for Lifetime Achievement to the Book Arts in Canada by The Alcuin Society.
