= Frank Davey =

Canadian poet

- Born: Frankland Wilmot Davey; April 19, 1940 (age 86); Vancouver, British Columbia, Canada
- Education: University of British Columbia
- Occupations: Poet; editor; scholar

Frankland Wilmot Davey, FRSC (born April 19, 1940) is a Canadian poet and scholar.

Born in Vancouver, British Columbia, he grew up in the Fraser Valley village of Abbotsford. In 1957, he enrolled at the University of British Columbia where, in 1961, shortly after beginning MA studies, he became one of the founding editors of the influential and contentious poetry newsletter TISH. In the spring of 1962, he won the university's Macmillan Prize for poetry, and published the poetry collection D-Day and After, the first of the Tish group's numerous publications. In 1963, he began teaching at Canadian Services College Royal Roads Military College in Victoria. He began doctoral studies at the University of Southern California in the summer of 1965, completing in 1968. After serving as writer-in-residence at Montreal's Sir George Williams University, he joined the English Department of York University in Toronto in 1970, becoming department chair in 1986. He was appointed in 1990 to the Carl F. Klinck Chair of Canadian Literature at the University of Western Ontario in London. From 1975 to 1992, he was one of the most active editors of the Coach House Press. He currently lives in Strathroy, Ontario.

== Biography ==
=== Early life and education ===
Frank Davey was born in Vancouver, British Columbia, but raised in the nearby Fraser Valley village of Abbotsford (1941 population 562), close to the Canada-US border. He was the son Wilmot Elmer Davey, a hydro company laborer and truck driver, and Doris Brown, who had emigrated with her family from Britain at age 4. Much of his childhood in Abbotsford is pseudonymously recounted in his 2005 poetry volume Back to the War and in the first person in his 2011 memoir When TISH Happens. Together the two books also provide the only mid-century literary portrait of the surprisingly diverse Abbotsford community and the surrounding Fraser Valley farmland. Davey enrolled at the University of British Columbia in 1957 where he met the influential poetry theorist Warren Tallman and student writers George Bowering, Daphne Marlatt, Lionel Kearns, Carol Bolt, Jamie Reid, and Fred Wah, and in 1960 the charismatic San Francisco poet Robert Duncan. With Bowering, Reid, and Wah, and the advice of Tallman and Duncan, he founded the poetry newsletter TISH in 1961.

=== Academic and writing career ===
The success of TISH, which the editors mailed free of charge for nineteen successive months to poets, editors, and critics across Canada and much of the US, brought Davey to the attention of the senior Canadian writers George Woodcock and Louis Dudek. Woodcock, editor of the journal Canadian Literature, commissioned in 1962 the first of several essays from him, and Dudek invited him to guest-edit a Vancouver issue of his important poetry magazine Delta. Woodcock's intervention may have been the more significant, encouraging the young poet to take up literary criticism as well, and from the 1970s to the 1990s write a body of work that would be called 'the most individual and influential ever written in Canada.'

Davey published his first poetry collection, D-Day and After, in 1962, with an introduction by Tallman that emphasized how this was poetry as the act of the moment rather than poetry as the commonplace attempt 'to express ... feelings.' It was the first of more than a hundred volumes to be published by the TISH editors. Receiving an MA from UBC in 1963, Davey taught for the Canadian armed forces at Royal Roads Military College in Victoria, British Columbia, until 1969, while also working on a doctorate in poetics at the University of Southern California in the summers of 1965 and 1966, and a 1966–1967 leave of absence. He witnessed the 1965 Watts riots from an apartment within the curfew zone, feeling more endangered, he indicates in 'Writing a Life' (99–100) and When TISH Happens (224), by the US National Guard than by the mostly black protesters. It seems very possible that this experience contributed to his later insistence in his political and cultural writings that the Canadian nation-state should be a collaboration open to the meaningful participation of all its citizens. In the fall of 1965 his third and fourth volumes of poetry were published. He also launched his poetry and criticism journal Open Letter that fall of 1965, designing it initially as an open editorial dialogue with former Tish editors Bowering and David Dawson. In the spring of 1968, he received his PhD, having presented a thesis on the poetics of the Black Mountain poets.

In the spring of 1969, he was appointed Writer-in-Residence for 1969–1970 at Sir George Williams (now Concordia) University in Montreal. The following year he joined the faculty of York University in Toronto to teach Canadian Literature and, amid teaching and research collaborations with Clara Thomas and Barbara Godard, quickly assumed a nationally influential role. He published two poetry collections in each of 1970, 1971, and 1972, and a selected poems in 1972. He published a monograph on Earle Birney in 1971, and the widely praised From There to Here: A Guide to English-Canadian Literature Since 1960, the first book to theorize Canadian postmodernism, in 1974. But his most important contribution in these years was his withering critique, 'Surviving the Paraphrase,' of the thematic criticism of Northrop Frye, D. G. Jones and Margaret Atwood which he delivered at the founding conference of the Association for Canadian and Quebec Literatures in the spring of 1974. That paper, in Stephen Scobie's words 'a vastly influential essay', almost immediately discredited thematic criticism in Canada and, forty years later, reverberates as well within Canadian postcolonial studies.

In 1976, he was appointed Coordinator of the York University creative writing program, and also joined, along with bpNichol and Michael Ondaatje, the new editorial board of The Coach House Press. With the assistance of Nichol and Barbara Godard, he was also expanding the pages and range of Open Letter to give attention to Québécois poets, women writers, and poststructuralist poetics, developing it into what Gregory Betts in The Canadian Encyclopedia would call 'Canada's most important forum for discussion and examination of innovative and experimental ideas and texts.' In 1982, he helped conduct a month-long workshop in Dharwar, India, for young academics many of whom became major contributors to Canadian Studies in that country. Here he wrote one of his most important long poems, the "brilliant poetic commentary on postcolonialism" The Abbotsford Guide to India, published in 1986—one of six poetry books he published in the 1980s. That year he was also elected chair of the York University Department of English. Two years earlier he had published the first study of Margaret Atwood's feminism: Margaret Atwood: A Feminist Poetics. As Chair of English he supported Joseph Pivato, the Elia Chair at York for 1987–1988, to teach the first course on Italian-Canadian literature.

In 1990, he was named the first Carl F. Klinck Professor of Canadian Literature at the University of Western Ontario (now Western University), in London, Ontario, and began a new writing phase in which he adapted discourse analysis to Canadian cultural studies, and examined various Canadian cultural scenes—from those of literary criticism to those of politics, celebrity, and popular crime writing. His new books included Post-National Arguments: The Politics of the Anglo-Canadian Novel since 1967 (1993), Reading 'KIM' Right (1993), an analysis of the public persona of Kim Campbell, Canada's first woman prime minister, Canadian Literary Power (1994), a study of how Canadian literary reputations are constructed and defended, Karla's Web: A Cultural Examination of the Mahaffy-French Murders (1994), an examination of how newspaper crime writing distorts both victims and criminal justice issues, Cultural Mischief: A Practical Guide to Multiculturalism (1996), a poetry collection that mocked both the sentimentalities of multiculturalism's proponents and the narcissism of its critics, and Mr & Mrs G-G (2002) an examination of Canadian Governor-General Adrienne Clarkson and her husband, writer John Ralston Saul, that accused both of a pretentiousness that misrepresented and stifled actual Canadian realities. As Betts observes with some understatement, this was 'a critical stance that has occasionally put him into conflict with the Canadian literary establishment.' Its consequences are likely reflected in Davey's description in When TISH Happens of Canadian literary and academic prizes as institutional rewards for 'banality and careerism' (304). Meanwhile, in May 1994, he had been elected president of the Association of Canadian College and University Teachers of English (ACCUTE). That November he had led the Association in issuing a controversial and widely publicized 'caution' against the postsecondary education policies of the British Columbia government and the resulting working conditions and quality of education at its recently established University Colleges.

Davey continued his creativity at the expense of currently established critical pieties in the poetry collections Dog (2002) and Risky Propositions (2005), both partly directed at identity politics, the 'flarf' books Lack On! (2009), a mock-Lacanian tribute to Fred Wah, and Bardy Google (2010), part of which was a Dunciad-like send-up of recent Canadian criticism, and the limited edition visual poetry book, Canonical Canadian Literature (2011). Meanwhile, the final years of provincial mandatory retirement legislation ended his Western Ontario teaching years in 2005. He was elected to the Royal Society of Canada in 2014.

=== Family life ===
Davey married education student Helen Simmons, also from Abbotsford, in 1962, during the final year of his MA studies. She later taught school in Victoria and accompanied him to the University of Southern California where she earned a master's degree in special education. They divorced in 1969. Shortly after, he married Linda Jane McCartney, with whom he had two children, Michael Gareth, b. 1970, and Sara Geneve, b. 1971. Linda Davey graduated from Osgoode Hall Law School in 1978 and practiced law in Toronto until 1994. She also served with Davey on the editorial board of the Coach House Press from 1976 to 1988. She died of a brain tumor in 2000. His memoir, How Linda Died, which contains many details of their life together and their relations with their children, is, according to BC Bookworld editor Alan Twigg, 'Davey's most accessible and memorable book ... his most atypically direct and personal.'

== Contributions to poetry and literary criticism ==
=== Influence ===
Davey has usually been viewed as a major influence on both Canadian poetry and Canadian literary criticism. Twigg has quoted George Fetherling as having called TISH Canada’s 'most influential literary magazine.' Ken Norris, in his study of Canadian little magazines, calls Davey's Open Letter 'the most important avant-garde periodical in Canada.' Betts writes that '[T]hrough his books of poetry, his literary and cultural criticism and his rich range of essays on diverse topics, Davey has been a major figure involved in introducing the idea and practice of postmodernism to writers in Canada.' Scobie adds that he has 'often been seen as a 'poet's poet' ' (276).

=== TISH ===
Betts writes that 'the TISH community has been described as the first post-colonial literary movement in English Canada because they wrote after and neither about nor because of colonialism.' Alexander Varty, reviewing When TISH Happens for The Georgia Straight, writes that it is possible 'that TISH's emphasis 'on the self as a consciousness in process rather than a stable persona' has become the norm in Canadian poetry and indeed in much Canadian fiction – a significant contribution, and one that's worth celebrating.'

=== 'Surviving the Paraphrase' ===
Diana Brydon begins her introduction to the Frank Davey 'festschrift issue' of Studies in Canadian Literature: 'In 1974, Frank Davey's conference paper 'Surviving the Paraphrase' took the small world of Canadian literary criticism by storm. The tenor of discussion changed as writers and critics became more self-conscious about their place in the world and how they engaged it in their work.' In her essay in this issue, Smaro Kamboureli writes ' 'Surviving the Paraphrase,' originally presented in 1974 at the founding meeting of the association of Canadian and Quebec Literatures, and subsequently published in Canadian Literature in 1976, inaugurates a pivotal moment ... in the development of Canadian criticism, for it presents one of the earliest, albeit brief, critiques of thematic criticism in Canada.' She adds 'If I were to identify a single major contribution Davey has made to Canadian critical discourse, this would be the instrumental role he has played in showing the importance of methodology, that methodology is inextricably related to how we understand the canon, textuality, the critical act, and nation-formation. The fact that he drew attention to method at a time when Canadian literary discourse was by and large oblivious to it makes his contribution all the more important. Method – directly thematized or appearing in different guises – figures in his work with remarkable consistency and with interesting results.'

=== Poetry ===
The poems of Davey's first poetry collection, D-Day and After, described in Tallman’s introduction as 'a weathervane pointing which way the verse winds may be blowing,' for the most part adapted the early projectivist poetics and typewriter spacing of Charles Olson to the lyric poem. It was mockingly reviewed by Ontario poet and playwright James Reaney – 'I'm not too sure that instead of projecting himself through his typewriter, his typewriter isn't projecting itself through him.' Two of the poems, however, 'To the Lions Gate Bridge' and 'The Guitar Girls,' are among the most successful processual poems produced by the Tish poets, with the former declared by Robert Duncan to be 'a poem without lapse' In Davey's next three books, Bridge Force (1965), City of the Gulls and Sea (1964), and The Scarred Hull (1966), Olson's influence is evident mostly in the research-based focus on place, especially in the latter. All three rather undistinguished books only slightly declined the prevailing lyric conventions of Canadian poetry. But they also differed significantly from each other.

Davey's emerging tendency to modify or enlarge his poetics with each new book or cluster of books became more apparent in his first four poetry books of the 1970s and their differing approaches to a phenomenological prosody. Weeds (1970) is a sequence of one-paragraph prose poems with frequent disjunctions between the sentences. The Clallam (1973) is a narrative of a 1907 British Columbia shipwreck constructed in brief exclamatory sections that recall the abrasive mock narratives of Jack Spicer. King of Swords (1972) retells much of the Arthurian story in contemporary diction to suggest the continuing persistence of that story's self-destructive masculinism. Arcana (1973) uses longer lines, postmodern indeterminacy and the imagery of the Rider-Waite Tarot deck in purportedly unfinished 'manuscript poems,' each dated and printed within quotation marks. All these books were outside, or alongside, usual Canadian poetry practices. The most visible Black Mountain influence in the latter two books was the medievalism of Robert Duncan, but much differently framed.

Davey published two strikingly unusual books in the 1980s. The first was Capitalistic Affection! (1982), in which a young boy absorbs sexual stereotypes in the weekly comic strips of the North American 1940s. The book uses comic strip idioms, mixed with occasional metafictional commentary, to analyze further the Arthurian inheritance and its imbrication with commodity culture, while also creating numerous disturbingly poignant moments. He followed this in 1986 with another anomalous work, The Abbotsford Guide to India, a book of poetry constructed as a tourist guide. Critic Katie Trumpener comments that 'Davey's Guide is a manifesto from Abbotsford about the connected perspectives and cultural cross-pollination of different peripheries,' one that 'bypasses ... the empire's nominal centre' and adds that the poems 'point to the obvious vestiges of colonial consciousness in a still emphatically British Columbia (especially in the survival of colonial attitudes toward its own 'Indians'), but they also identify more mysterious residues of colonial self-doubt and self-hatred.' Again these books had little relationship to the ongoing lyric norms of Canadian poetry or, in their sharp movements away from each of Davey's preceding books, to the more consistent modes of poetic dissent being created by other Canadian poets such as bill bissett, Daphne Marlatt, and bpNichol. He also published in the 1980s the bitterly humorous Edward & Patricia (1984) and the collection of poetic reorientations of Canadian history The Louis Riel Organ and Piano Company (1985). The latter contains Davey's most frequently taught longer poem, 'Riel,' a Spicerian deconstruction of the various narratives that have claimed to represent the Canadian Métis martyr.

In all these books there had been evident a strong interest in cultural criticism and semiotics, an interest which became central to his literary criticism in the early 1990s with the publication of his Post-National Arguments and Canadian Literary Power. Davey's first poetry collection of the 1990s was the ironically titled Popular Narratives (1994), with its cover image of the Ljubljana statue of the Slovenian national poet France Prešeren being blessed by a beautiful muse but both covered in bird droppings. Among the book's 'popular' narratives were Davey's story of the murder of Agnes Bernauer in fifteenth-century Bavaria and his prose-poem elegy for bpNichol into which he incorporates the stories of both Eloise and Abelard and Camille Claudel and Auguste Rodin as ones of teacher-student exploitation. As he had written in 1972 in King of Swords, 'the myth of Arthur continues.' In 1996, he published the collection Cultural Mischief, with one of its poems a very different elegy to the painter Greg Curnoe, constructed of 32 short staccato stanzas that echo the disjunctive structure of Curnoe's best-known paintings. It's a poem that Lynette Hunter writes 'not only erases the heroic elegiac voice but also textures the body of the dead.'

During the next few years and the illness and death of his wife, and his writing of How Linda Died (2002), Davey appears to have worked on the completing of a manuscript first published as the on-demand digital chapbook War Poems in 1979 and published as a much longer book, Back to the War, in 2005. The 75 poems narrate a childhood story of being on the 'backside' of World War II but in a family that replicates much of that war’s tensions and gender metaphors, into which the child becomes an unknowing but inevitable conscript. On the cover is a photo of the battlecruisers HMS Hood and HMS Repulse in Vancouver harbour on which has been superimposed an amateur snapshot of a young boy in a British sailor suit. Like most of Davey's books, including The Scarred Hull, Weeds, The Clallam, King of Swords, Capitalistic Affection!, Edward & Patricia, and The Abbotsford Guide to India, the collection functions as both a long poem and a unified sequence of separable parts.

Davey takes up flarf techniques in his 2010 Bardy Google, manipulating internet algorithms to produce a variety of texts that portray the limitations and variety of internet culture. For many readers the most surprising of these has been 'Sydney's Wreck,' in which Davey's algorithms produce a collage-narrative of the World War II disappearance and later location of the Australian light cruiser HMAS Sydney – a narrative in which the ideological investments of a wide range of Australians becomes evident. As usual, flarf throws a luminous spotlight on language usage. Here Davey uses it to extend the semiotics underpinnings of his Popular Narratives and Cultural Mischief. Davey's 2014 collection Poems Suitable to Current Material Conditions is almost entirely (and mischievously) about language, from poems that riff on cliché phrases such as 'I'm good,' 'just sayin',' and 'going forward,' to a flarf poem that puns on Jacques Lacan's name and theories to illuminate the feelings of lack and entitlement that societies both wealthy and poor repeatedly declare.

In a note written on Tish in 1991 Tallman writes that Davey's magazine Open Letter can be viewed as standing for all the ventures of the Tish poets 'as evidence of some active secret of the imagination original Tish let loose upon the world,' and that Davey can be viewed 'as a type of all the other Tish poets who were in on the secret' – 'that he exemplifies in himself how much imagination when possessed can manage.' Davey's own imagination appears to have been strongly influenced by the events of the Second World War, from the title of his first collection through the comic strip images of the war in Capitalistic Affection!, his 'multiple choice' Hiroshima poem of Cultural Mischief, the colouring book warfare and plastic war machines of Back to the War, to the colliding ideologies of HMAS 'Sydney's Wreck' in Bardy Google.

== Selected bibliography ==
=== Poetry ===
- D-day and After – 1962
- City of the Gulls and Sea – 1964
- The Scarred Hull – 1965
- Bridge Force – 1965
- Weeds – 1970
- Four Myths for Sam Perry – 1970
- Griffon – 1972
- King of Swords – 1972
- L'An Trentiesme: Selected Poems, 1961–70 – 1972
- Arcana – 1973
- The Clallam, or, Old Glory in Juan de Fuca – 1973
- Selected Poems: The Arches – 1980 (edited by bpNichol) ISBN 0-88922-174-X
- Capitalistic Affection! – 1982 ISBN 0-88910-244-9
- Edward and Patricia – 1984 ISBN 0-88910-274-0
- The Louis Riel Organ and Piano Company – 1985 ISBN 0-88801-096-6
- The Abbotsford Guide to India – 1986 ISBN 0-88878-262-4
- Popular Narratives – 1994 ISBN 0-88922-285-1
- Cultural Mischief – 1996 ISBN 0-88922-364-5
- Dog – 2002 – ISBN 1-894174-78-X
- Back to the War – 2005 ISBN 0-88922-514-1
- Risky Propositions – 2005 ISBN 1-894214-97-8
- Lack On! – 2009 ISBN 978-0-9813548-0-4
- How We Won the War in Iraq – 2009 ISBN 978-0-9813548-1-1
- Bardy Google – 2010 ISBN 978-0-88922-636-4
- Afghanistan War: True, False – or Not – 2010 ISBN 978-0-9813548-2-8
- Canonical Canadian Literature – 2011 ISBN 978-0-9813548-3-5
- Spectres of London Ont – 2013 ISBN 978-0-9813548-5-9
- Poems Suitable to Current Material Conditions – 2014 ISBN 978-1-77126-053-4
- Motel Homage for Greg Curnoe – 2014 ISBN 978-0-9813548-6-6

=== Non-Fiction ===
- Five Readings of Olson's Maximus – 1970
- Earle Birney – 1971
- From There to Here: A Guide to English-Canadian Literature Since 1960 – 1974 ISBN 0-88878-036-2
- Louis Dudek and Raymond Souster – 1980 ISBN 0-88894-264-8
- Surviving the Paraphrase – 1983 ISBN 0-88801-075-3
- Margaret Atwood: A Feminist Poetics – 1984 ISBN 0-88922-217-7
- Reading Canadian Reading – 1985 ISBN 0-88801-130-X
- Post-National Arguments: The Politics of the Anglophone-Canadian Novel since 1967 – 1993 ISBN 0-8020-2785-7
- Reading 'Kim' Right – 1993 ISBN 0-88922-342-4
- Canadian Literary Power – 1994 ISBN 0-920897-57-6
- Karla's Web: A Cultural Investigation of the Mahaffy-French Murders – 1994 ISBN 0-670-86153-7
- How Linda Died – 2002 ISBN 1-55022-497-2
- Mr & Mrs G.G – 2003 ISBN 1-55022-565-0
- When TISH Happens – 2011 ISBN 978-1-55022-958-5
- aka bpNichol: A Preliminary Biography – 2012 ISBN 978-1-77041-019-0

=== Anthologies Edited ===
- TISH Nos. 1–19 – 1975 ISBN 0-88922-077-8
- The SwiftCurrent Anthology – 1986 (edited with Fred Wah) ISBN 0-88910-317-8

== See also ==
- Canadian literature
- Canadian poetry
- List of Canadian poets
