= Mechademia =

Peer-reviewed academic journal

Mechademia: Second Arc
- Subject: Anime and manga studies, Japanese studies, Asian studies, Media studies
- Language: English
- Edited by: Frenchy Lunning, Sandra Annett

Publication details
- Former names: Mechademia: An Annual Forum for Anime, Manga, and the Fan Arts
- History: 2006–present
- Publisher: University of Minnesota Press (United States)
- Frequency: Biannually

Standard abbreviations
- ISO 4: Mechademia

Indexing
- ISSN: 1934-2489 (print); 2152-6648 (web)
- LCCN: 2006215646
- OCLC no.: 72523390

Links
- Journal homepage; Online access at Project MUSE; Online archives at Project MUSE

Mechademia: Second Arc is a biannual (formerly annual) peer-reviewed academic journal in English about Japanese popular culture products and fan practices. It is published by the University of Minnesota Press and the editor-in-chief is Frenchy Lunning. Mechademia has also held an annual conference since 2001.

== Volumes ==
Since 2006, ten volumes have been published. Each volume is dedicated to a collection of articles themed around a specific topic, such as shojo manga or anime and manga fandom. It is indexed in Project MUSE and JSTOR. After a break of three years, a new series of Mechademia volumes (Second Arc) was launched beginning in 2018, the first being themed around childhood. The scope of Mechademia will be broadened to include all of Asia in its remit.

| No. | Title | Release date | ISBN |
|---|---|---|---|
| 1 | Mechademia 1: Emerging Worlds of Anime and Manga | December 22, 2006 | 978-0-8166-4945-7 |
| 2 | Mechademia 2: Networks of Desire | December 26, 2007 | 978-0-8166-5266-2 |
| 3 | Mechademia 3: Limits of the Human | November 5, 2008 | 978-0-8166-5482-6 |
| 4 | Mechademia 4: War/Time | November 11, 2009 | 978-0-8166-6749-9 |
| 5 | Mechademia 5: Fanthropologies | November 9, 2010 | 978-0-8166-7387-2 |
| 6 | Mechademia 6: User Enhanced | November 3, 2011 | 978-0-8166-7734-4 |
| 7 | Mechademia 7: Lines of Sight | November 7, 2012 | 978-0-8166-8049-8 |
| 8 | Mechademia 8: Tezuka's Manga Life | January 21, 2014 | 978-0-8166-8955-2 |
| 9 | Mechademia 9: Origins | December 10, 2014 | 978-0-8166-9535-5 |
| 10 | Mechademia 10: World Renewal | November 2015 | 978-0-8166-9915-5 |
| 11.1 | Childhood | Fall 2018 | 978-1-5179-0635-1 |
| 12.1 | Transnational Fandom | Fall 2019 | 978-1-5179-0842-3 |
| 12.2 | ASIAN MATERIALITIES | Spring 2020 | 978-1-5179-0843-0 |
| 13.1 | QUEER(ING) | Spring 2020 | 978-1-5179-1130-0 |
| 13.2 | Soundscapes | Spring 2021 | 978-1-5179-1204-8 |
| 14.1 | Science Fiction | Fall 2021 | — |
| 14.2 | NEW FORMULATIONS OF THE OTAKU | Spring 2022 | — |
| 15.1 | MODES OF EXISTENCE | Fall 2022 | — |
| 15.2 | 2.5D Culture | Spring 2023 | — |
| 16.1 | MEDIA MIX | Winter 2023 | — |
| 16.2 | MEDIA INDUSTRIES AND PLATFORMS | Summer 2024 | — |
| 17.1 | COSPLAY, STREET FASHION, AND SUBCULTURAL STYLES | Winter 2024 | — |
| 17.2 | METHODOLOGIES | Summer 2025 | — |
| 18.1 | DEATH AND OTHER ENDINGS | Winter 2025 | — |
| 18.2 | New Approaches to Studio Ghibli | Summer 2026 | — |
| 19.1 | "Semiosis/Symbiosis" | Winter 2026 | — |
| 19.2 | Graphic Narratives | Summer 2027 | — |
| 20.1 | "Gametides" | Winter 2027 | — |
| 20.2 | Erotic Bodies – Hentai, BL, and Beyond | Summer 2028 | — |
| 21.1 | Urban Architectures & Fan Spaces | Winter 2029 | — |
| 21.2 | Isekai: Other Worlds | Summer 2029 | — |
| 22.1 | Race, Class, and Asian Hip Hop | Winter 2030 | — |
| 22.2 | Indigeneity | Summer 2030 | — |
| 23.1 | Subjectivities | Winter 2031 | — |
| 23.2 | “-Punked”: Imagining Resistance | Summer 2031 | — |

== Reception ==
Steve Raiteri from Library Journal commends Mechademia as a "great first effort [...] bridg[ing] the gap between academics and fans." Christophe Thouny, writing for Animation also thought the writing and tone was accessible by both academics and fans. Ed Sizemore from Comics Worth Reading criticizes the journal for its review and commentary section because they "read like summaries of the works (films and books) discussed with no actual critique of the work". However, Sizemore commends the journal's academic essay section.

By contrast, Raiteri in Library Journal states that fans will find the Review and Commentary section "the most accessible" section of the journal. Kevin Gifford contrasts Mechademia with shallower works on anime, praising its "insightful essays and reviews" and detail, calling it "worthwhile reading for anyone hungry for intelligent writing" about anime. Tomo Hirai of the Nichi Bei Times described the first volume as "an informative and inspiring read for those curious beyond the skin of anime".

A review of the second volume of Mechademia by Comics Worth Reading's Johanna Draper Carlson criticises the journal for its dry tone and "flat statements following after each other separated only by footnote numbers". A later review by Ed Sizemore recommends that Mechademia "should stop trying to develop a theme for each issue". Active Anime's Holly Ellingwood comments that the journal's "strong academic bent may put off some potential readers but give it a chance and peruse through the many varied topics". A later review by Scott Campbell commends the third volume of Mechademia as being "extremely insightful and thought provoking ... [about] anime, manga, and even the future of mankind". D. Harlan Wilson found the third volume to be "as accessible as it was provocative and enlightening".

William McClain criticises the fourth volume for having articles that are "too restrictive" in focus, calling attention to the lack of discussion, in this volume, of how anime and manga culture has spread internationally. McClain also criticises the volume for not including enough visual aids for the general reader, but praises the Mechademia journal as a whole for its experimental approach. Ellen Grabiner feels that War/Time takes the approach that war has become a part of everyday life in post-war Japanese society, and praises the broad range of essays. Timothy Iles feels that the strength of Mechademia is that it provides "theoretically informed, historically grounded, jargon-free research that highlights first and foremost, not the self-serving virtuosity of the researcher, but the interpretive depth of the material under analysis."

== Abstracting and indexing ==
According to Ulrichsweb, Mechademia is abstracted and indexed in EBSCOhost, Gale, OCLC, and ProQuest.

== Most cited articles ==
According to Google Scholar, the three most-cited papers in Mechademia are:

- Winge, Theresa (2006). "Costuming the Imagination: Origins of Anime and Manga Cosplay". Mechademia. 1 (1): 65–76. doi:10.1353/mec.0.0084. S2CID 121679787.
- Ōtsuka, Eiji (2010). "World and Variation: The Reproduction and Consumption of Narrative". Mechademia. 5 (1): 99–116. S2CID 142625519.
- Wong, Wendy Siuyi (2006). "Globalizing Manga: From Japan to Hong Kong and Beyond". Mechademia. 1 (1): 23–45. doi:10.1353/mec.0.0060. S2CID 120264789.
