= TISH =

TISH was a Canadian poetry newsletter founded by student-poets at the University of British Columbia in 1961. The publication was edited by a number of Vancouver poets until 1969. The newsletter's poetics were built on those of writers associated with North Carolina's Black Mountain College experiment.

Contributing writers included George Bowering, Fred Wah, Frank Davey, Daphne Marlatt, David Cull, Carol Bolt, Dan McLeod, Robert Hogg, Jamie Reid, and Lionel Kearns. Influenced by the poetry theorist Warren Tallman, the Tish Group also drew inspiration from Robert Creeley, Robert Duncan, Charles Olson and Jack Spicer.

TISH launched a number of other publications including the alternative newspaper The Georgia Straight, edited by McLeod; the poetry newsletter SUM (1963–65), edited by Wah; the magazine of the long poem Imago (1964–74), edited by Bowering; the journal of writing and theory Open Letter (1965–2013), edited by Davey; the prose journal Periodics (1977–81), edited by Marlatt and Paul de Barros; Motion: A Prose Newsletter, edited by David Cull and Robert Hogg (1962), the TISHBooks imprint, and the online journal Swift Current (1984–1990), edited by Davey and Wah, who described it as the world's first e-magazine.

In 2001, George Fetherling wrote in The Georgia Straight that "the journal [TISH] started by George Bowering, Frank Davey, David Dawson, Jamie Reid and Fred Wah is probably the most influential literary magazine ever produced in Canada, of greater significance than even Preview or First Statement, the two that brought poetic modernism to the country in the 1940s."
