= Diamond Grill =

Book by Fred Wah

- Author: Fred Wah
- Genre: Non-fiction, biography
- Publisher: Edmonton
- Publication date: 1996
- Media type: Print
- Pages: 176 pgs

Diamond Grill is a 1996 semi-fictional biography by Canadian novelist and poet Fred Wah. The book was first published in 1996 by NeWest Press, based in Edmonton, Alberta. Diamond Grill is told through both prose and poetry and utilizes a first person narrative.

The book won the Howard O’Hagan prize for short fiction and has been described by Wah as a way to explore his "hyphenated identity". The book has also been credited with helping to popularize the term "biotext", a term coined by George Bowering.

== Synopsis ==
The book describes Wah's experiences of the Diamond Grill, his father's restaurant in Nelson, British Columbia, and of the impact of growing up as a child of mixed heritage in the 1950s. Diamond Grill also discusses other locations, such as different restaurants, China, and a hospital where his father was once held.

== Themes ==
Diamond Grill explores several different themes, with racial identity being one of the most predominant. The usage of imagery to explore the book's various themes has often been commented on by various academics, with the appearance of the Diamond Grill's swinging doors in the beginning and ending of the novel being described as a way of accentuating the difference between the "Occident and Orient". In one of Diamond Grill's chapters, Wah talks about how some people had difficulty associating Wah with his last name, as he is only 1/8th Chinese and looks predominantly Caucasian. Elaine Chang argues in her book Reel Asian: Asian Canada on screen that people do not react to an "almost-white" person with an Italian name in the same way that they would if that individual possessed a Chinese one, and that this reaction causes some to think "maybe you're not Canadian".

The idea of food as it relates to culture has also been commented upon, with Vera Regan stating that Wah uses food as a way to connect his commentary to "tie him to his family, his culture, and his identity".

Of the book's title, Pauline Butling described that being in the "Diamond Grill" meant to be in "[a] precious and yet contradictory space of interrogation, to be either 'colourless or tinted'".

== Reception ==
Critical reception for the book has been positive, with Canadian Literature praising Diamond Grill's complexity. The Quill & Quire called the book "beguiling" and wrote that it gave them "much to think about on the subject of identity, particularly how we and our society collude, often destructively, in its construction".

== Adaptations ==
In 2019 Fred Wah adapted the Diamond Grill as a radio play called A Door to be Kicked, which was performed in front of a live audience in Nelson, B.C. The script was subsequently recorded for broadcast and podcast by Kootenay Co-op Radio and the podcast was launched in February, 2022
