= Steffler =

Steffler is a surname. Notable people with the surname include:

- Christel Steffler (born 1930), German diplomat
- John Steffler (born 1947), Canadian poet and novelist
