= Frenchy Lunning =

American anime academic

- Occupations: Anime scholar; film producer

Academic background
- Education: University of Iowa; Hamline University; University of Minnesota
- Thesis: Comic Books: Sex And Death At The Edge Of Modernity (2001)
- Doctoral advisor: Barbara E. Martinson

Academic work
- Discipline: Popular culture
- Sub-discipline: Anime and manga
- Institutions: Minneapolis College of Art and Design

Nancy Erroll French Lunning is an American academic who specializes in anime. She is a Professor Emeritus in Liberal Arts at the Minneapolis College of Art and Design.

== Biography ==
Nancy Erroll French Lunning was born to Patricia McGrew and William French and graduated from Muscatine High School in 1968. She received her Bachelor of Arts from the University of Iowa and her Master of Arts in Liberal Studies from Hamline University. In 2000, she received her PhD in Design, Housing and Apparel from the University of Minnesota; her dissertation Comic Books: Sex And Death At The Edge Of Modernity was supervised by Barbara E. Martinson. She became a professor at the Minneapolis College of Art and Design in 1980, and she was director of their SES program from 1994 until 2010. She later became Professor Emeritus in Liberal Arts.

As an academic, Lunning specializes in anime and manga. She and Sandra Annett are the co-editors of Mechademia, an academic journal on Japanese popular culture; she alone was also the editor of the journal's first run from 2006 until 2015. In 2013, she published Fetish Style, a book on fetish fashion. In 2022, she wrote the book Cosplay: The Fictional Mode of Existence. She has also served as the director of the Schoolgirls and Mobile Suits conference and its successor Mechademia Conference. She has also written chapters on object-oriented ontology.

Outside of academia, Lunning also worked in the film industry, as a costume designer and stage manager, and also as a producer for Moving Walkway Productions, a film production company specializing in music videos. She was a guest at KakkoiCon 2008 and AniMinneapolis 2011, two anime conventions in her local Minneapolis.

== Publications ==
- Fetish Style (2013)
- Cosplay: The Fictional Mode of Existence (2022)
