= Pierre DesRuisseaux =

Canadian poet

Pierre DesRuisseaux (7 July 1945 – 18 January 2016) was a Canadian poet. He was named the fourth Canadian Parliamentary Poet Laureate on April 28, 2009.

DesRuisseaux graduated with a degree in philosophy from the Université de Montréal. DesRuisseaux previously won the Governor General's Award for French language poetry in 1989 for his collection Monème. He was also nominated for the Governor General's Award for English to French translation in 1996 for Contre-taille, an anthology of translated poetry by English Canadian writers.

DesRuisseaux was born in Sherbrooke, Quebec. "His career-long fascination with Canada's literary traditions and history make him an excellent choice to engage us, as Canadians, in dialogue about the importance of verse in our national culture," Speaker of the Senate of Canada Noel Kinsella said about DesRuisseaux.

DesRuisseaux wrote the Livre des proverbes québécois and Dictionnaire des expressions québécoises, chosen by the Quebec Association for Intercultural Education as a work representative of Quebec's popular culture. On 18 January 2016, he died at the age of 70.

In 2017, it was revealed that in his volume of French language poetry, Tranches De Vie, DesRuisseaux had plagiarized a number of English language authors, including Maya Angelou, Dylan Thomas, Louis MacNeice, Charles Bukowski, Ted Kooser, and Tupac Shakur. For some critics, the notion of plagiarism appears doubtful in this case.

Preceded by John Steffler	Parliamentary Poet Laureate; 2009–2011	Succeeded by Fred Wah
