= Pauline Michel =

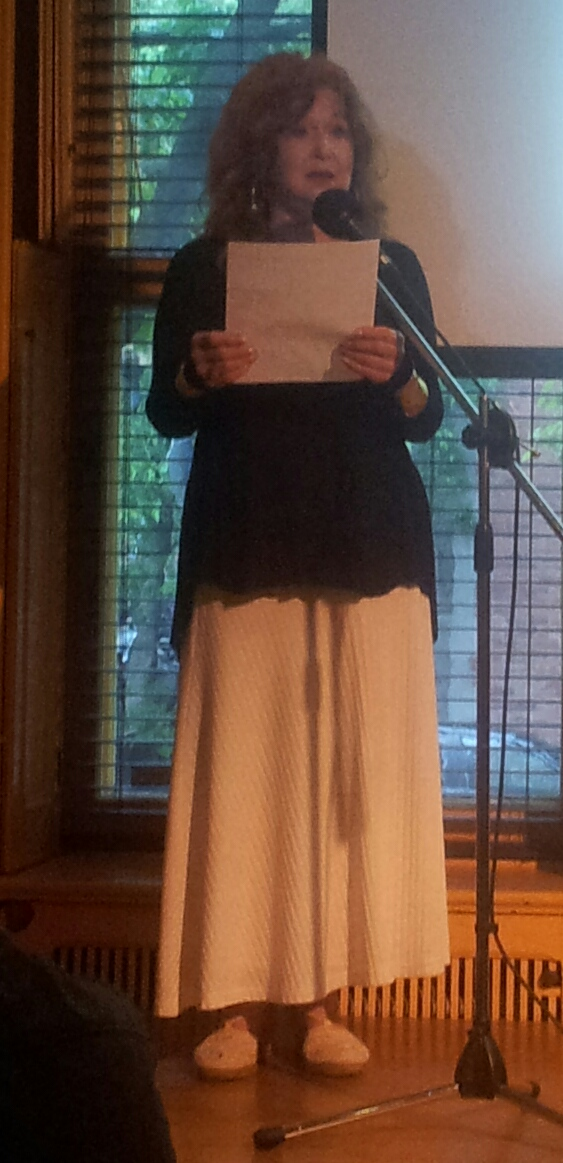
Pauline Michel

Pauline Michel (born 1944 in Asbestos, Quebec) is a Canadian novelist, poet, playwright, songwriter and screenwriter.

Michel has a Bachelor of Education from the Université de Sherbrooke as well a teaching certificate from École normale Marguerite Bourgeois and Université Laval.

Her work has appeared on Radio-Canada, Télé-Métropole, TV Ontario and Télé-Québec.

In 2004, Michel was appointed the second ever Canadian Parliamentary Poet Laureate, succeeding George Bowering. She served as Poet Laureate until November 16, 2006.

Preceded by George Bowering	Parliamentary Poet Laureate; 2004–2006	Succeeded by John Steffler
