= Copithorne =

Copithorne is a surname. Notable people with the surname include:

- Clarence Copithorne (1920–1979), Canadian politician
- Judith Copithorne (1939–2025), Canadian poet
