= Robert Russell Reid =

Canadian book artist and printer (1927–2022)

Robert Russell Reid (26 October 1927 – 21 January 2022) was a Canadian book artist, typographer, printer and graphic designer.

== Life and career ==
Robert Russell Reid was born on 26 October 1927. He began his fascination with printing as young boy, having received a toy printing press as a gift. After graduating from University of British Columbia, he set up his own shop in downtown Vancouver.

From 1963 to 1976, worked at McGill University in Montreal as a designer and production manager at McGill University Press. During his tenure, Reid expanded the university's existing Redpath Press imprint to produce a number of ambitious books he felt no existing press in Canada was capable of undertaking. Two noteworthy works from Reid's iteration of Redpath Press were the Lawrence Lande Collection Canadiana (1965) and Portrait of a Period (1967).

In 2007 the Alcuin Society for the book arts in Canada inaugurated the annual Robert R. Reid Medal for Lifetime Achievement in the Book Arts in Canada, and named Read as the first recipient.

Robert Russell Reid died on 21 January 2022, at the age of 94.
