= Alcuin Society =

Canadian non-profit organization

- Founded: 1965
- Founder: Geoffrey Spencer
- Founded at: Vancouver, BC
- Type: Nonprofit
- Legal status: Active
- Purpose: Promoting interest in book arts, fine printing and book collecting
- Location: Canada
- Publication: Amphora
- Website: alcuinsociety.com

A voluntary association established in 1965 by Geoff Spencer, the Alcuin Society is a non-profit organisation founded for the book arts. It is located in Canada. The society is named after Alcuin of York.

== Alcuin Awards ==
Since 1981, the society has awarded an Alcuin Awards for Excellence in Book Design in Canada. It is Canada's only national book design competition. Winners of the award are Canadian book designers whose books were published in the country in the previous calendar year. To qualify, a book must be designed by a Canadian designer and published by a Canadian publisher.

The University of Saskatchewan Archives and Special Collections displayed books which had been distinguished with awards by the Alcuin Society.

== Robert R. Reid Medal ==
In 2007 the Alcuin Society inaugurated the annual Robert R. Reid Medal for Lifetime Achievement in the Book Arts in Canada, and named Read as the first recipient. The full list of winners is given on the Alcuin Society website.

- 2024 Michael Torosian
- 2023 Martin Jackson
- 2020 Odette Drapeau
- 2019 Tim & Elke Inkster
- 2018 Robert Bringhurst
- 2017 Denise Lapointe & David Carruthers
- 2015 Rod McDonald
- 2015 Jan & Crispin Elsted, Barbarian Press
- 2013 William Rueter RCA MGDC
- 2012 Stan Bevington
- 2011 Glenn Goluska
- 2010 Jim Rimmer
- 2009 Frank Newfeld
- 2007 Robert R. Reid

== Publications ==
- The society's journal is Amphora (ISSN 0003-200X)
- From Writer to Reader (ISSN 1911-7302) an ejournal deposited with E-LIS.

== Arms ==
Coat of arms of Alcuin Society
Notes Granted 15 June 2007. Crest Issuant from a circlet of maple leaves Or and dogwood flowers Argent a demi-sixteenth-century pressman affronty Proper habited Azure holding in the dexter hand a composing stick and in the sinister hand a punch Or. Escutcheon Per chevron Azure and Argent in chief two open books Argent edged Or and in base a handpress Azure. Supporters Two owls Or each gorged with a collar Azure pendent therefrom a hurt that to the dexter charged with a quill and a knife in saltire Or that to the sinister charged with a rose Argent standing on a rocky mound Proper above barry wavy Azure and Argent.
