= Aliquando Press =

Canadian small press publisher

The Aliquando Press is a small press book publishing company in Canada, owned and operated by William Rueter.

Aliquando Press' first book, A Bach Fugue, was published in 1962. Since then, Aliquando Press has published more than 100 books. Broadsides are an important part of Aliquando Press' production.

Rueter studied at the Ontario College of Art and at the City Literary Institute in London, England. Because he controls production, he has been able to experiment freely with book design, calligraphy, hand-setting of type, printing and book-binding. In 1965, he printed a limited edition of Edgar Allan Poe's short story "The Cask of Amontillado", using cloister type in black and red ink on grey paper and a cover printed on handmade paper.

He has written a book, Order Touched With Delight: Some Personal Observations on the Nature of the Private Press, about typesetting and printing, has worked as a designer for the University of Toronto Press, and was a founding member of the Society of Canadian Book Designers. He has also designed several Canadian stamps for Canada Post, and the cover of the 1981 Encyclopedia of Music in Canada.

The press' work has been shown in North America and Japan and is included in public and private collections in North American and Europe, including the Toronto, New York and San Francisco public libraries, the College of William & Mary in Williamsburg, the British Library and the Museum van het Boek in The Hague.

Rueter was awarded the Robert R. Reid Award for lifetime achievement or extraordinary contributions to the book arts in Canada by the Alcuin Society in 2013.
