= Canadian Parliamentary Poet Laureate =

National poet laureate of Canada

- Poète officiel du Parlement du Canada
- Incumbent; Chimwemwe Undi since 2025
- Reports to: Library of Parliament
- Nominator: Parliamentary Librarian of Canada, Librarian and Archivist of Canada, Commissioner of Official Languages, and; Chair of the Canada Council
- Appointer: Speaker of the Senate and Speaker of the House of Commons
- Term length: 2 years
- Constituting instrument: Parliament of Canada Act
- Formation: 2001
- First holder: George Bowering
- Salary: CA$20,000
- Website: lop.parl.ca/About/Parliament/Poet/index-e.html

The Canadian parliamentary poet laureate (French: Poète officiel du Parlement du Canada) is the national poet laureate of Canada. The current poet laureate is Chimwemwe Undi.

The position is an office of the Library of Parliament.

== Role ==
According to the laureate's official Web site: "The Poet's role is to encourage and promote the importance of literature, culture and language in Canadian society. Federal legislators created the position in 2001 to draw Canadians' attention to poetry, both spoken and written, and its role in our lives."

The Parliament of Canada Act states that the laureate may:

- Write poems "especially for use in Parliament on important occasions"
- Sponsor poetry readings
- Give advice to "the Parliamentary Librarian regarding the Library's collection and acquisitions to enrich its cultural materials"
- Do anything else: "perform other related duties at the request of the Speaker of the Senate, the Speaker of the House of Commons, or the Parliamentary Librarian."

The laureate serves at the pleasure of both the Speaker of the Senate and the Speaker of the House of Commons, with the maximum term of office set at two years.

The position comes with an annual stipend of $20,000, up to $13,000 in travel expenses annually, a budget for administrative expenses and translation/adaptation into Canada's second official language.

== Selection criteria ==
In order to be chosen for the position, a poet must have:

- contributed to the cultural and literary community
- produced written or oral work reflecting Canada
- be an accomplished literary artist who has influenced other artists
- a substantial record demonstrating literary excellence

== Poets laureate ==
- George Bowering (2002-2004)
- Pauline Michel (2004-2006)
- John Steffler (2006-2008)
- Pierre DesRuisseaux (2009-2011)
- Fred Wah (2011-2013)
- Michel Pleau (2014-2016)
- George Elliott Clarke (2016-2017)
- Georgette LeBlanc (2018-2019)
- Louise Bernice Halfe a.k.a. Sky Dancer (2021–2023)
- Marie-Célie Agnant (2023–2024)
- Chimwemwe Undi (2025-2026)

== See also ==
- Poet Laureate of Ontario
