= Lionel Kearns =

Canadian poet and teacher (born 1937)

- Born: Lionel John Kearns; February 16, 1937 (age 89); Nelson, British Columbia, Canada
- Education: University of British Columbia
- Occupations: Poet; writer

Lionel John Kearns (born February 16, 1937) is a writer, educator, philosopher and polyartist, known for his innovative literary forms, and his contributions to the field of digital poetics. He is recognized as an early and significant poet in the history of Canadian avant-garde literature.

== Early life and education ==
Kearns was born in Nelson, British Columbia, Canada. His parents were Dorothy Welch and Charles Francis Kearns, WW I aviator, short story writer, and conservationist. During WW II the family moved to the town of MacLeod, Alberta (now called Fort Macleod), where his father was a flying instructor in the British Commonwealth Air Training Plan (BCATP). After the war the family returned to Nelson, where Kearns spent the next ten years as an active student, athlete (baseball & hockey), and musician (bagpipes and saxophone). This period of his life was also marked by frequent trips with his father on foot and horseback through the natural wilderness of south-east British Columbia. These early activities and experiences are frequent subjects of Kearns's literary works.

In 1955 Kearns moved to Vancouver and enrolled at the University of British Columbia (UBC), where he began his language and media studies, and associated with a group of young writers that included George Bowering, Frank Davey and Fred Wah. Kearns was one of the originators of the influential poetry magazine, Tish. Over the nine years that he was a student, graduate student, and instructor at UBC, his principal mentors were Earle Birney, Warren Tallman, and Ronald Baker, who introduced him to the works of Marshall McLuhan and Noam Chomsky.

In 1964, after graduating with an M.A. in Literature and Creative Writing from UBC, Kearns won a Commonwealth Scholarship to study Linguistics at the School of Oriental and African Studies (SOAS) at London University. In England, he was an active participant in the British Poetry Revival, and came under the influence of Bob Cobbing, Dom Sylvester Houédard and various members of the Concrete Poetry movement. He also spent six weeks as a production assistant on the set of Peter Watkins's controversial BBC film, The War Game (1966), which dealt with nuclear war, and its devastating effects on life and civil order in Britain.

== Career ==
In 1966, after a year of field work on the island of Trinidad, Kearns returned to Canada to take a position in the English Department at the newly established Simon Fraser University in Burnaby, where he taught for the next twenty years, with the exception of 1982–83, when he was the Writer in Residence at Concordia University in Montreal.

Kearns's early publications were mostly based in print. His books, such as By the Light of the Silvery McLune: Media Parables, Poems, Signs, Gestures, and Other Assaults on the Interface (1969), and Convergences (1984), reflected his focus on language and his novel approaches to literary presentation. In later years, he embraced newly developing technologies and applications, which allowed him to combine graphics, hyperlinked text, audio, and video. His work, which blurred the line between traditional forms and digital media, made him a pioneer in the widening field of electronic literature. He is a key figure in the evolution of poetry in the digital age.

Kearns first published book, Songs of Circumstance (1963) presented a study of variable meter in oral poetry, focusing on breath groups that exist in emotionally textured speech. The book proposed a new type of page notation for poems, called "Stacked Verse", which featured a vertical line called a "stress axis" running through the prominent syllable of each "stacked-foot" of an utterance. Kearns used a set of his own poems to illustrate the system. Although he eventually abandoned this notation as impractical, given the constraints of typesetting at that time, "Stacked-Verse" was discussed in a variety of literary publications, drawing international attention to his early work. In 1964, the American Beat writer, Jack Kerouac, wrote, "Lionel Kearns is brilliant, that's mah opinion!"

In 1965, while studying generative linguistics at the School of Oriental and African Studies (SOAS), London University, Kearns produced his best known and most durable work, The Birth of God mandala, now called Birth of God / uniVers , or BoG/uVr. Consisting of a zero made of ones encircling a one made of zeros, it is a simple algorithm that generates any number of distinct physical iterations. BoG/uVr, with its binary display of 1s and 0s, has been credited as the icon that announced in the Digital Age. It stands today as one of the earliest examples of digital art.

At Simon Fraser University, where he taught between 1966 and 1986, a period before the arrival of the Internet and the World Wide Web, Kearns set up electronic seminars for his students, using computer bulletin boards and available terminals connected to the university's single primitive mainframe computer, which he also used to write, edit, and format his widely discussed work, Convergences, a book-length meditation on a 1778 incident at Nootka Sound, when Captain Cook and the crew members of his two ships mingled for an unprecedented month of social interaction. Convergences, with its unique page layout and extra-linear structure, has been described as hardcopy-hypertext, a unique post-modern glimpse of the colonial process, and Kearns's most important work.

After retiring from Simon Fraser University in 1986, Kearns taught a pre-internet online graduate course entitled, "The Cybernetics of Poetry", for ConnectEd, the distance education facility of the New School for Social Research in New York City. In 1988 he became the first Writer-in-Electronic Residence, helping Trevor Owen establish the WIER project, an on-line creative writing program for school students that flourished across Canada for more than twenty years. When Apple's HyperCard application became available, Kearns used it to construct interactive poems, later transposing them into Flash documents that ran on the Web. Kearns displayed his digital creations, including a colorful updated version of Convergences, on his own website, which is available on the Wayback Machine internet archive.

== Philosophy ==
Kearns has claimed that the purpose of poetry is to stimulate consciousness, waking us up to the fact that we are still here, alive, and free to act. The poet's job is to trick language into truth. Beneath the humor, irony, and sense of wonder that rises to the surface in much of his work, there lurks a layer of serious intellectual interrogation and philosophical statement. The fact that many of his digital works have now disappeared as a result of media obsolescence, parallels his acceptance of the transience of experience and the mutability of life. Presence and absence, like life and death or 1 and 0, are the interdependent binary opposites that straddle Being. Kearns's major concerns remain: time, language, intelligence, and existence.

== Publications ==
Songs of Circumstance. Tish Press, 1963.

Listen George. Imago Press, 1965.

The Birth of God. Tlalloc 10, back cover, 1965.

Pointing. Ryerson Press, 1967.

By the Light of the Silvery McLune: Media Parables, Poems, Signs, Gestures, and Other Assaults on the Interface. Daylight Press, 1969.

The Birth of God (cine-poem), with Gordon Payne, 1973.

About Time. Caledonia Press, 1974.

Poems for a Manitoulin Canada Day. Blueointment Press, 1976.

Negotiating a New Canadian Constitution (cine-poem), with Gordon Payne. National Film Board of Canada, 1974.

Practicing Up to be Human. Coach House Press, 1978.

Ignoring the Bomb: New and Selected Poems. Oolichan Press, 1982.

Convergences. Coach House Press, 1984.

A Few Words Will Do. Talonbooks, 2007.

Electropoeta: la leyenda de Silvery McLune: Poemas de Lionel Kearns. Translation by Javier Raya. Publicado por Centro de Cultura Digital. Mexico. 2015. [interactive ePub format] https://editorial.centroculturadigital.mx/libro/electropoeta#

== Reviews ==
• Robert Creeley. "More on Kearns." A Quick Graph: Collected Notes and Essays. Ed. Donald Allen. Four Seasons Foundation, 1970, pp. 269–70.

• George Bowering. "Metaphysic in Time: The Poetry of Lionel Kearns." A Way With Words. Oberon Press, 1983, pp. 101–120.

• Lianne Moyse. "Dialoguing the Monologue of History and Lyric: Lionel Kearns' Convergences." Open Letter. 7th series no.4 (Summer 1989), pp. 15–27.

• Manina Jones."Log Entries: Exploring Discursive Space in Lionel Kearns's Convergences." Beyond Tish. NeWest, 1991, pp. 222–234.

• Grant Williams. "Reading Against Consumption: Metafiction in Lionel Kearns' Convergences." Canadian Poetry (Spring 91) pp. 40–53.

• Jim Andrews. "On Lionel Kearns." Vispo. 2004. www.vispo.com/kearns

• Jessica Langston. "Then and Now Converging: Lionel Kearns's Complicated Nation". Studies in Canadian Literature / Études en littérature canadienne, Volume 35, numéro 1, 2010, pp. 40–55.
