= Chimwemwe Undi =

Canadian writer (born 1994)

- Occupations: Poet, Lawyer
- Writing career
- Period: 2020s–present
- Notable work: Scientific Marvel
- Notable awards: Lansdowne Prize for Poetry
- Website: www.chimwemweundi.com

Chimwemwe Undi (born 1994 or 1995) is a Canadian poet and lawyer from Winnipeg, Manitoba. She is the current Canadian Parliamentary Poet Laureate, and was poet laureate of Winnipeg for 2023 and 2024.

Born in Winnipeg, Undi moved to Namibia at age two, before moving back to Manitoba as a child. She attended high school at Fort Richmond Collegiate, before embarking on a career in law. In 2022, she won the John Hirsch Emerging Manitoba Writer Award at the Manitoba Book Awards. Undi was appointed the third Winnipeg Poet Laureate in 2022.

Undi's 2017 debut pamphlet The Habitual Be was published by Akashic Books and included in the collection New-Generation African Poets: A Chapbook Box Set, edited by Chris Abani and Kwame Dawes.

Her first full-length collection of poetry Scientific Marvel was published by House of Anansi Press in 2024. The book was the winner of the Governor General's Award for English-language poetry at the 2024 Governor General's Awards, the Raymond Souster Award in 2025 and the Lansdowne Prize for Poetry at the 2026 Manitoba Book Awards. The book was also shortlisted for the 2025 Gerald Lampert Award.

She was named Canada's 11th Parliamentary Poet Laureate on January 29, 2025.
