= Bill Bissett =

Canadian poet

Bill Bissett CM
- Born: William Frederick Bissett; November 23, 1939 (age 86); Halifax, Nova Scotia, Canada
- Other name: Bill Bissett
- Education: Dalhousie University
- Occupations: Poet, musician, lyricist, writer
- Years active: 1950s–present

Bill Bissett (born William Frederick Bissett, born November 23, 1939), commonly stylised as bill bissett, is a Canadian poet known for his unconventional style especially regarding unusual orthography and the use of visual elements.

== Early life and education ==
Bissett was born in Halifax, Nova Scotia. The son of a judge, Frederick William Bissett, Bissett had a tumultuous childhood, often ran away from home as a child, and developed peritonitis. Bissett faced several years of hospitalizations and also experienced bullying because of his sexuality, "I was trying to do as well as I could, and getting snowballs thrown at me with rocks in them because I was gay and I was getting beaten up and having really no friends."

He attended Dalhousie University (1956) and the University of British Columbia (1963–1965). After completing course requirements for his two majors in English and Philosophy, Bissett dropped out of both universities to avoid academic constraints.

In 1962, he had one child with partner Martina Clinton, Ooljah Bissett (who later in life changed her name to Michelle), who died in 2012 from an unknown illness.

== Career ==
Bissett moved to Vancouver, British Columbia, in 1958. In 1962, he started blewointment magazine. He later launched blewointmentpress, which has published volumes by Cathy Ford, Maxine Gadd, Michael Coutts, Dick Clements writing under the pen name, "p.x. belinsky", Hart Broudy, Rosemary Hollingshead, Beth Jankola, Carolyn Zonailo, bpNichol, Ken West, Lionel Kearns, and D. A. Levy.

In 1965, a CBC documentary by Maurice Embra was filmed of Bissett, entitled Strange Grey Day This, the documentary is one of the earliest known documentations of Bissett's poetry and art.

In 1968, Bissett collaborated with experimental rock group Th Mandan Massacre to release a spoken word album, Awake In The Red Desert, in a limited edition of 500 copies. The album became a highly sought after collector's item, until reissued by Feeding Tube Records in 2019. In 1969, having performed earlier in the evening at a concrete poetry show, Bissett fell through a folding door that was supposed to be latched shut and plummeted 20 feet to a basement concrete floor, severely injuring his head. Bissett suffered brain damage, and was rendered catatonic and paralyzed. A two-year court case was won by the insurance company and Bissett never received any compensation.

In 1977, Bob Wenman and a group of other Conservative Members of Parliament objected to the funding of some Canadian poets, Bill Bissett in particular, by the Canadian Council for the Arts, on moral grounds. Wenman, when speaking to Jean Chrétien (then a Minister of Finance), described Bissett's work as "disgusting and pornographic." While in Parliament, Wenman requested that Bissett's literary work be read into the record, but his request was denied by the Speaker as not relevant.

After Wenman's accusations in 1977, and until June 1978, Bissett received no funding from Canadian Council grants, although there is no clear indication that Wenman's allegations were the cause of this. Indeed, according to Frank Davey, a Canadian poet and scholar, by as early as 1974, Bissett had been "ejected from cross-Canada trains, evicted by countless landlords, beaten, harassed by police, and arrested and sentenced to prison."

In 1983, financial hardship, plus a desire to focus on his own writing and visual art, led him to sell blewointment press (which later became Nightwood Editions). Bissett moved to London, Ontario in 1985. From 1986 to 1991, Bissett was the lyricist and vocalist in the London, Ontario band Luddites, they released several demo cassettes and an LP. They disbanded in 1991, but released a compilation of their works in 2007. Following constant harassment from law enforcement in London, Bissett moved to Toronto, Ontario in 1992, where he currently resides.

In 2006, Nightwood Editions published radiant danse uv being, a poetic tribute to Bissett with contributions from more than 80 writers, including Margaret Atwood, Leonard Cohen, Lorna Crozier, Patrick Lane, Steve McCaffery, P. K. Page, and Darren Wershler-Henry. In 2006, he was also featured in an episode of the television series Heart of a Poet produced by Canadian filmmaker Maureen Judge.

Bissett's sound poetry was sampled by The Chemical Brothers on their 2007 CD We Are the Night. The CD title was taken from Bissett's "Ode To D.A. Levy". The CD went #1 in the UK and North American Electronic Music Charts.

In 2007, Bissett was awarded the George Woodcock Lifetime Achievement Award for outstanding contributions to literature in British Columbia. The following year, he was given an Honorary Doctorate in Literature from Thompson Rivers University.

In 2015, "Th ground is a prspektiv" by Bissett was once again sampled by The Chemical Brothers, this time for their album Born in the Echoes in "I'll See You There".

In 2019, an anthology of poems from nearly every previously published Bissett book, entitled breth was published through Talonbooks. breth features hundreds of poems dating as early as the late 1950s, to as recent as the late 2010s. Bissett is now based in Toronto.

Bissett is known in Toronto as a peer support worker and is the treasurer of the schizophrenia peer support group The Secret Handshake founded in 2004, by Bissett and Jordan Stone.

In June 2024, he was appointed to the Order of Canada. In July 2024, a compilation album of previously unreleased or out of print sound recordings of Bill Bissett's poetry entitled "circulin th moon" was independently released digitally on Bissett's Bandcamp page.

== Art and poetry ==
Bissett uses unusual orthography and incorporates visual elements in his printed poetry, and his performance of "concrete sound" poetry, sound effects, chanting, barefoot dancing and playing a maraca during his poetry readings. Frank Davey described him as "rejecting the conventional or 'straight' world [...] not only in lifestyle but in ruthless alterations to conventional syntax and spelling." Themes in his work range from the mystical to the mundane, incorporating humour, sentimentality, and political commentary. He often does not capitalise his name or use capital letters. He has had large exhibits of his paintings. In the Paris Review, Jack Kerouac called Bill Bissett one of "the great poets."

== Bibliography ==
- We Sleep Inside Each Other All - 1966
- Th Jinx ship and other trips: pomes drawings, collage - 1966
- Th gossamer bed pan - 1967
- Lebanon voices - 1967
- Where is Miss Florence Riddle? - 1967, reprinted 1973
- What Poetiks - 1967
- Awake in th red desert! - 1968
- Of the land divine service: poems - 1968
- Liberating skies - 1969
- The Lost Angel Mining Co. - 1969
- S th story I to: trew adventure - 1970
- Tuff shit: love pomes - 1970
- Why dusint the League of Canadian Poets do sumthing and get an organizer for cross country poetry reading circuit: [sic] press release. - 1970
- RUSH what fuckan theory - 1971, reprinted 2012
- Blew trewz - 1971
- IBM - 1971
- Dragon fly - 1971
- Nobody owns th earth - 1971
- Ice - 1972
- Pomes for Yoshi - 1972
- Vancouver Mainland Ice and Cold Storage - 1973, reprinted 1974, 1992
- Th first sufi line - 1973
- Pass th food release th spirit book - 1973
- Living with the vishyun - 1974
- Medicine my mouth's on fire - 1974
- Space travl - 1974
- What - 1974
- Yu can eat it at th opening - 1974
- Image being - 1975
- Stardust - 1975
- Th fifth sun - 1975
- Venus - 1975
- Th Wind Up Tongue - 1976 (ISBN 0887840221)
- An allusyn sic to macbeth - 1976
- Sailor - 1978
- Selected poems: beyond even faithful legends (editor) - 1980
- Northern birds in color - 1981
- Seagull on Yonge Street - 1983
- Write me an Adventure - 1983
- Canada gees mate for life - 1985
- The Last Blewointment anthology (editor) - 1986
- Animal uproar - 1987 (ISBN 9780889222472)
- What we have - 1988 (ISBN 9780889222625)
- howard xperiences - 1990
- Hard 2 beleev - 1990 (ISBN 978-0-88922-277-9 )
- Inkorrect thots - 1992 (ISBN 978-0-88922-303-5)
- Th last photo uv th human soul - 1993 (ISBN 978-0-88922-322-6)
- Th influenza uv logik - 1995 (ISBN 978-0-88922-357-8)
- Loving without being vulnrabul - 1997 (ISBN 978-0-88922-372-1)
- Scars on th seehors - 1999 (ISBN 978-0-88922-387-5)
- B leev abul char ak trs - 2000 (ISBN 978-0-88922-433-9)
- The Oranges of Orangtangua - Housepress, Calgary 2002
- peter among th towring boxes / text bites - 2002 (ISBN 978-0-88922-464-3)
- narrativ enigma / rumours uv hurricane - 2004 (ISBN 978-0-88922-507-7)
- northern wild roses / deth interrupts th dansing - 2005 (ISBN 978-0-88922-532-9)
- ths is erth, thees ar peopul - 2007 (ISBN 9780889225572)
- sublingual - 2008 (ISBN 9780889225893)
- griddle talk: a yeer uv bill n carol dewing brunch - 2009 (ISBN 0889226067)
- Time - 2010
- Novel - 2011
- Hungree Throat - 2013
- Th Book - 2014
- Breth - 2019
- its th sailors life / still in treetment: meditaysyuns from gold mountain - 2022 (ISBN 978-1-77201-391-7)
