= Carolyn Zonailo =

Canadian poet

Carolyn Zonailo (born January 21, 1947) is a Canadian poet and publisher.

== Biography ==
Born in Vancouver, British Columbia, Canada. Zonailo studied at the University of Rochester, from which she received a B.A. in literature 1971. In 1980, she received a M.A. in literature from Simon Fraser University. She has also studied Jungian psychology, mythology and astrology.

In 1977, she founded Caitlin Press, which she ran with Cathy Ford and Ingrid Klassen. The press was later sold and relocated to northern British Columbia.

Zonailo lives in Montreal, Quebec, with her husband Stephen Morrissey and divides her time between Quebec and the West Coast.

== Selected bibliography ==
- 1977:Inside Passage. Vancouver: Caitlin Press
- 1981:The Wide Arable Land. Vancouver: Caitlin Press
- 1983:A Portrait of Paradise. Vancouver: Blewointment
- 1985:Compendium. Vancouver: Heron
- 1987:Zen Fores. Vancouver: Caitlin Press
- 1990:The Taste of Giving: New & Selected Poems. Vancouver: Caitlin Press ISBN 0-920576-30-3
- 1993:Nature's Grace. Montreal: Empyreal ISBN 1-895593-06-9
- 1993:Poem Factory ISBN 0-921852-03-7
- 1995:Memory House. Montreal: Empyreal ISBN 0-921852-08-8
- 1997:Wading the Trout River. Montreal: Empyreal ISBN 0-921852-18-5
- 1998:Winter. Pointe Claire: Morgaine House ISBN 0-9699233-5-X
- 2002:The Goddess in the Garden. Victoria: Ekstasis
- 2004:Holy Hours. Pointe Claire: Morgaine House
