= Michel Pleau =

Canadian poet (born 1964)

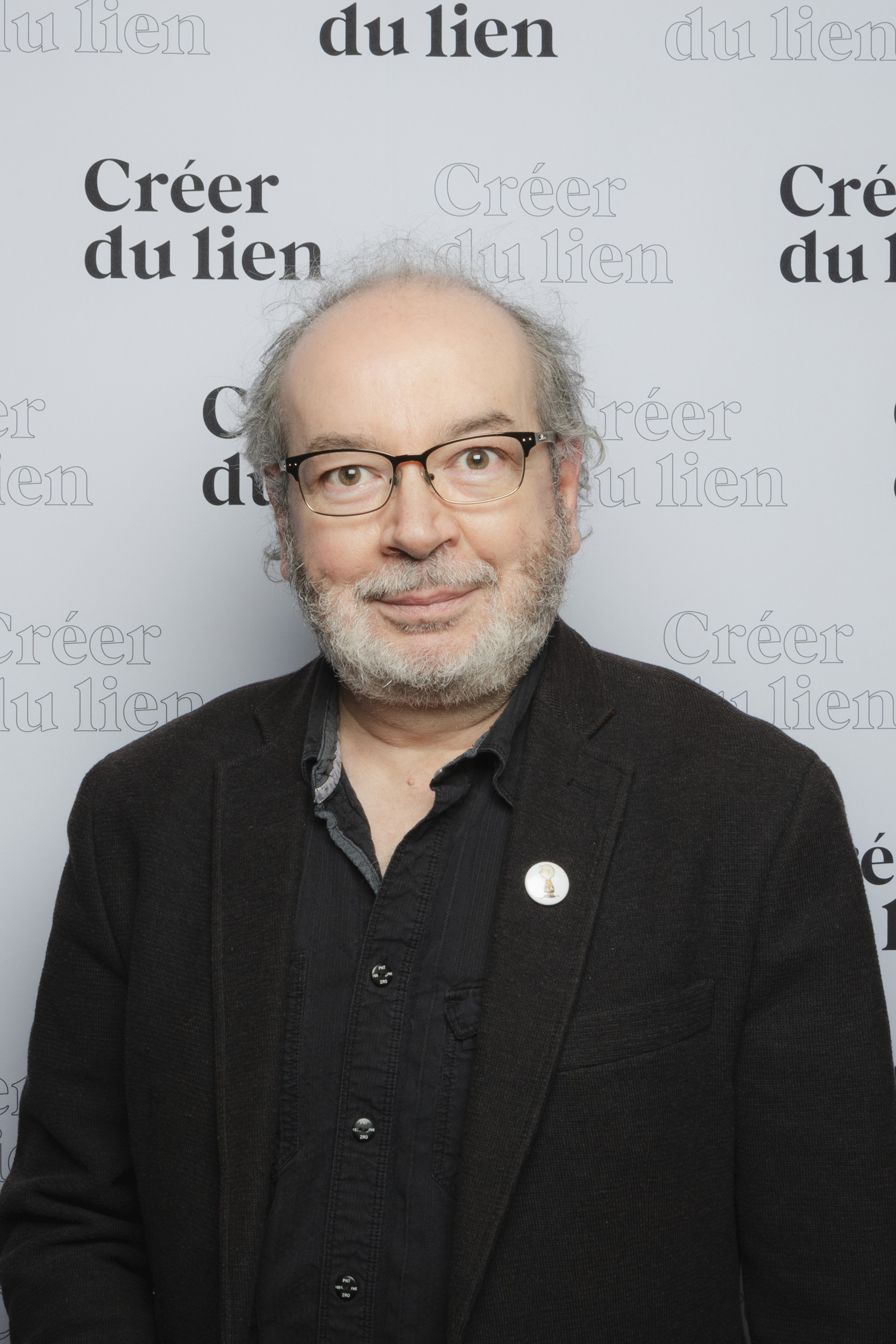
- Born: May 25, 1964 (age 62); Quebec City, Quebec
- Occupation: poet
- Writing career
- Notable work: La lenteur du monde

Michel Pleau (born May 25, 1964) is a Canadian poet, who was appointed Canadian Parliamentary Poet Laureate in January 2014.

Originally from the Saint-Sauveur district of Quebec City, he was educated at Université Laval and the Université du Québec à Montréal.

The author of numerous books of poetry and literary criticism, he won the Governor General's Award for French-language poetry at the 2008 Governor General's Awards for his collection La lenteur du monde. An English translation, Eternity Taking Its Time, was published by Bookland Press in 2012.

He won Quebec's Prix Alphonse-Piché, Prix Octave-Crémazie and Prix Félix-Antoine-Savard for earlier collections. In 1997, the Commission de toponymie du Québec named an unnamed island in the province's Caniapiscau Reservoir for his collection La traversée de la nuit, as part of a program honouring writers to mark the 20th anniversary of the Charter of the French Language.

His most recent collection, Ciel de la basse-ville, was published in 2014.

== Works ==
- Apprendre à partir (1985)
- Les Doux silences (1986)
- Le corps tombe plus tard (1992, ISBN 2-89046-257-9)
  - Spanish translation El cuerpo cae más tarde (2001, ISBN 2-89046-635-3)
- La traversée de la nuit (1994, ISBN 2-89018-300-9)
- Plus loin que les cendres (1996, ISBN 2-89018-356-4)
- Qui s'enfonce dans la nuit (1998)
- Regards sur le poème (1998, ISBN 2-921310-91-0)
- L'aveu tout simple d'un visage (1999, ISBN 2-89529-009-1)
- Il arrive que le ciel te console (2000, ISBN 2-89529-030-X)
- Soleil rouge (2004, ISBN 2-89597-031-9)
- Le feu de l'autre rive (2005, ISBN 2-89046-908-5)
- Arbres lumière (2005, ISBN 2-89597-045-9)
- La lenteur du monde (2007, ISBN 978-2-89597-081-1)
  - English translation Eternity Taking Its Time (2012, ISBN 9781926956312)
- Le petit livre de l'été (2012, ISBN 978-2-89597-263-1)
- Le ciel de la basse-ville (2014, ISBN 978-2-89597-390-4)
