= Ryan Knighton =

Canadian writer

Ryan Knighton (born 19. September 19, 1972 in Langley) is a Canadian writer best known for writing about his blindness, in books such as Cockeyed: A Memoir and C'mon Papa – Dispatches from a dad in the dark. He teaches English and creative writing at Capilano University and lives in Vancouver with his wife and daughter.

Knighton performed in the June 2012 edition of Don't Tell My Mother!, a monthly showcase in which authors, screenwriters, actors and comedians share true stories they would never want their mothers to know.

He is the subject of the 2008 documentary As Slow As Possible, by director Scott Smith.

He is the co-star of 2016 award-winning film, Blind Sushi, with Chef Bun Lai.

On April 15, 2019, Knighton joined a host of other writers in firing their agents as part of the WGA's stand against the ATA and the practice of packaging.

== Bibliography ==
=== Non-Fiction ===
- Cars (co-authored with George Bowering) (2002)
- Cockeyed: A Memoir (2006)
- C'Mon Papa: Dispatches from a Dad in the Dark (2012)

=== Poetry ===
- Swing in the Hollow (2001)
