= Coach House Books =

Canadian publisher

- Founded: 1965
- Founder: Stan Bevington
- Country of origin: Canada
- Headquarters location: Toronto, Ontario
- Distribution: Publishers Group Canada (Canada); Consortium Book Sales & Distribution (US)
- Publication types: Books
- Official website: www.chbooks.com

Coach House Books is an independent book publishing company located in Toronto, Ontario, Canada. Coach House publishes experimental poetry, fiction, drama and non-fiction. The press is particularly interested in writing that pushes at the boundaries of convention.

== History ==
The company was founded as Coach House Press in 1965 by artist Stan Bevington. It is known for publishing early works by writers such as Fred Wah, Daphne Marlatt, Margaret Atwood, Michael Ondaatje, Ann-Marie MacDonald, George Bowering, Nicole Brossard, Gwendolyn MacEwen, Christopher Dewdney, bpNichol and Anne Michaels, Darren O'Donnell, Sean Dixon, Greg MacArthur, Matthew Heiti, and Amiel Gladstone.

Coach House was at the centre of a number of innovations in the use of digital technology in publishing and printing, from computerized phototypesetting to desktop publishing. Notably, the pioneering SGML/XML company, SoftQuad, was founded by Coach House's Stan Bevington and colleagues Yuri Rubinsky and David Slocombe.

In 1991, Coach House was split into two separate companies: the printing house Coach House Printing, headed by Bevington, and the book publisher Coach House Press, headed by Margaret McClintock. Bevington subsequently tried, unsuccessfully, to reacquire the publishing company. Ultimately, the book publisher declared bankruptcy in 1996, and later the same year Bevington moved the printing company back into book publishing.

The company is located in several former coach houses on bpNichol Lane, near Spadina and Bloor, which were rented from Campus Co-operative Residence Incorporated. In 2004, controversy arose when the media reported that the cooperative would be demolishing the coach house buildings, and politicians and public interest groups campaigned to have the buildings declared a heritage site. In 2009, the company directly acquired the buildings for the first time in its history.

== Operations ==
Coach House is one of the few Canadian publishing companies that prints its own titles; the printing operations also print books for several other small Canadian publishers and literary magazines, including Acta Victoriana and the Hart House Review.

The reputation of the new Coach House has been growing steadily since its rebirth in 1997, but it skyrocketed with the publication of Christian Bök's Eunoia. This work of experimental poetry won the Canadian Griffin Poetry Prize in 2002 and has sold over 19,000 copies. Coach House books have been the recipients of dozens of other awards and nominations, including the Governor General's Award, the City of Toronto Book Award, the Commonwealth Writers' Prize, the Lambda Literary Award, the Books in Canada/Amazon.ca First Novel Award and the Trillium Book Award.

Its most recent successes have been a series of books of collected essays by Toronto writers on various aspects of their city. The first, uTOpia (2005), about various writers' notions of a perfectible Toronto, was a surprise hit and was followed by The State of the Arts (2006), GreenTOpia (2007) and HtO (2008) about water in the city. Frequent contributors to the volumes include John Lorinc, Shawn Micallef, Derek McCormack, Dylan Reid, Bert Archer, Stéphanie Verge, Chris Hardwicke, Mark Fram, Liz Forsberg, Dale Duncan and Darren O'Donnell. Also recently published in 2020 was Watch Your Head: Writers and Artists Respond to the Climate Crisis, edited by Kathryn Mockler, among others.

In 2008, Coach House was awarded the Province of Ontario's "Arts Organization Award" as part of the "Premier's Award for Excellence in the Arts".
