= Anime and manga =

Japanese animation and comics

Anime and manga, or animanga (Note: Animanga term refers to Japanese anime and manga, and was originally a trademark of Viz Media before it expired on October 28, 2016.) for short, are forms of mass media produced by the content industry of Japan.

The anime and manga industry forms an integral part of Japan's soft power as one of its most prominent cultural exports. Anime are Japanese animated shows with a distinctive artstyle. Anime storylines can include fantasy or real life. They are famous for elements like vivid graphics and character expressions. In contrast, manga is strictly paper drawings, with comic book style drawings. Usually, anime are adaptations of manga but some of the anime with original stories are adapted into manga form.

== Subculture ==
In Japanese, the word "subculture" (サブカルチャー, sabukaruchā) does not have the same connotation of oppositional culture as it does in English, so it is frequently used in situations where "fandom" might be preferred by Westerners instead.

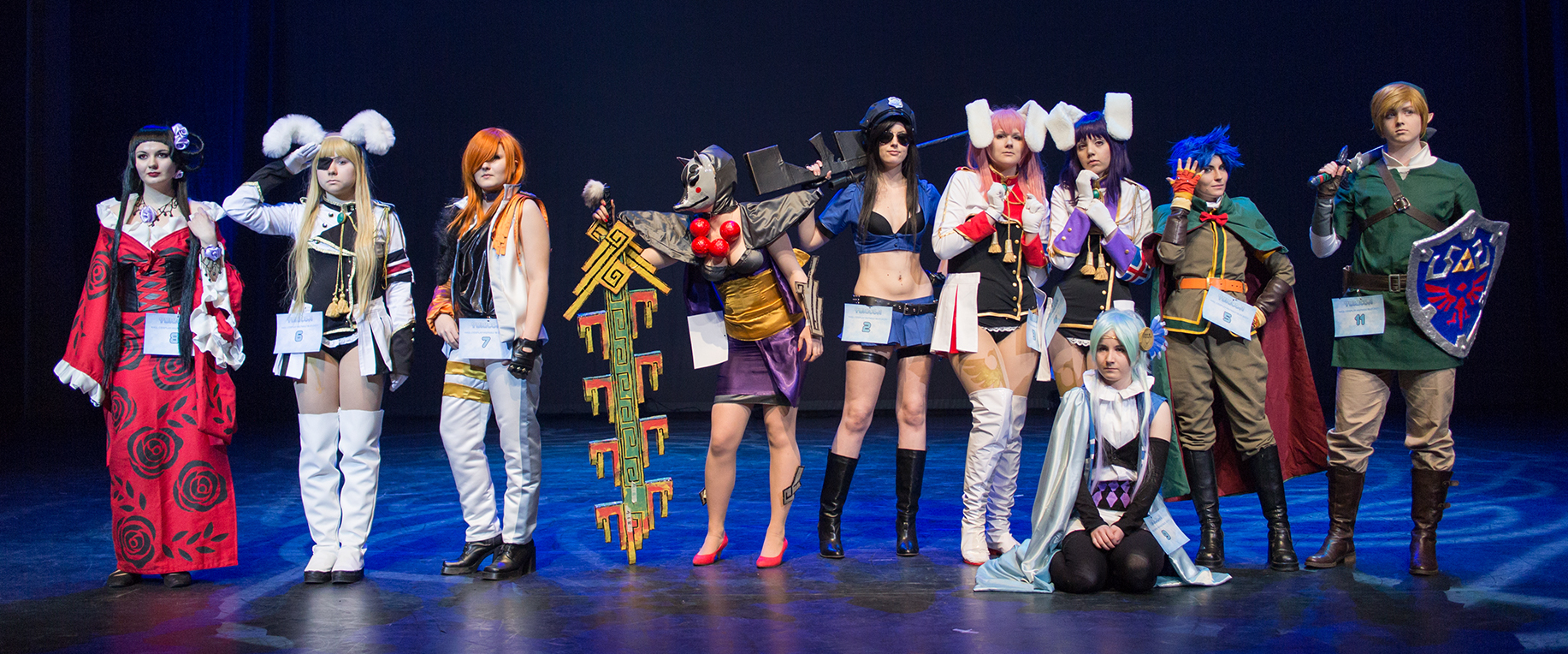
Cosplayers at Yukicon 2014, a fan convention in Finland

In Japan, most works start out as manga, with the most successful titles receiving an anime adaptation (アニメ化, anime-ka), but for overseas fans their first encounter with the subculture is typically through broadcast anime. It is common for a work to be distributed overseas via fansubs and scanlations, or unauthorized fanmade translations of anime and manga, respectively, before official translations become available. Typically, overseas fans will first translate the work into English, French, and Chinese, and then into other languages using those as an intermediary. The legality of the ethics of these fanmade translations has been hotly debated. Many of those involved refuse to profit from their translations out of principle, and destroy the copies once officially licensed versions become available. Some industry participants in both Japan and the United States have expressed tacit acceptance of fanmade translations, seeing them as a trial run for the American market.

Other types of media such as light novels and video games are frequently associated with and considered part of the anime and manga subculture.

== History ==
The explosive growth in Japan's soft power began in the 1970s, when it changed from a net importer to a net exporter of information. Prior to the late 1990s, the primary export of Japan's content industry was video games, but beginning in 2000, the Ministry of Education, Culture, Sports, Science and Technology recognized anime and manga as part of "traditional" Japanese culture, and the government began to promote them as part of its Cool Japan strategy, passing the Content Industry Promotion Law in June 2004. The value of the anime and manga industry is estimated at US$5 billion as of 2008.

Anime and manga were not widely marketed in the United States before the mid-1990s, with only a few titles available on network television. The rapid growth of the genre in the United States has led some commentators to deem it an American import rather than a Japanese export. Due to anime and manga's increased popularity overseas, various companies have begun catering to foreign audiences such as Kadokawa Corporation which has adopted the "Overseas first" policy.

In 2023, the Japan Business Federation laid out a proposal aiming to spur the economic growth of Japan by further promoting the contents industry abroad, primarily anime, manga and video games, for measures to invite industry experts from abroad to come to Japan to work, and to link with the tourism sector to help foreign fans of manga and anime visit sites across the country associated with particular manga stories. The federation seeks on quadrupling the sales of Japanese content in overseas markets within the upcoming 10 years.

== Industry growth ==
In 2021, the Association of Japanese Animations valued the country's anime market at $19.2 billion. Precedence Research, a research company for market insights, projects that the anime market will increase from $24.5 billion to $47.14 billion by 2028.

== In other languages ==
In China, dongman (traditional Chinese: 動漫; simplified Chinese: 动漫; pinyin: dòngmàn) is a portmanteau of donghua and manhua, used as an umbrella term for animation and comics. The term "dongman" is often mistakenly used to exclusively refer to the animation; in fact, the term should include both the donghua and the manhua. When video games are included, the term used is ACG (traditional Chinese: 動漫遊戲; simplified Chinese: 动漫游戏; pinyin: dòngmànyóuxì), short for "animation, comics, and games". A further extension which includes light novels is ACGN, or "animation, comics, games, and novels". Another term for the genre as a whole is erciyuan (Chinese: 二次元; pinyin: èrcìyuán), meaning "two-dimensional space". One of the most popular websites for ACGN content is bilibili.

== See also ==
- Glossary of anime and manga
- Cool Japan
- J-pop
- Manhwa (Korea)
