= Diana Brydon =

Canadian literary scholar

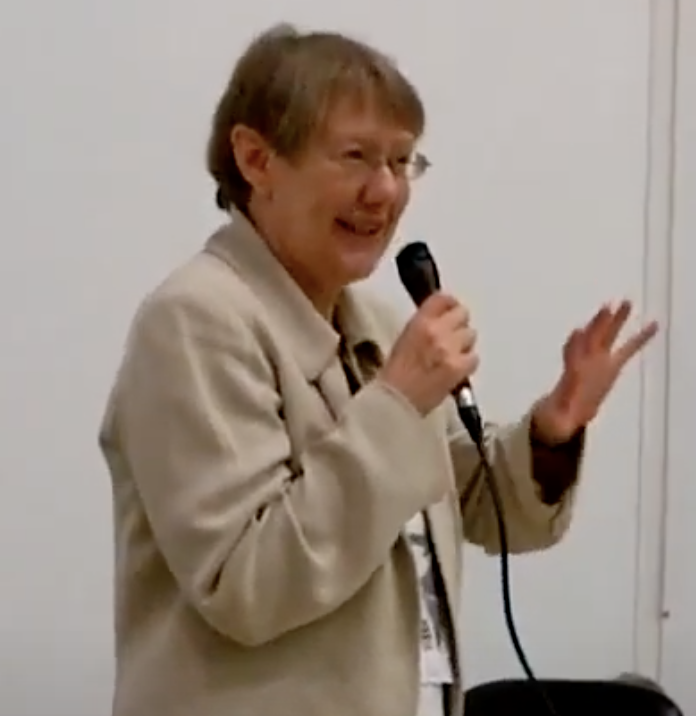
Brydon speaking at the Federal University of Minas Gerais, 2011.

Diana L. Brydon FRSC is a Canadian literary scholar, currently a Canada Research Chair at University of Manitoba.
