= John Steffler =

Canadian poet and novelist

John Steffler (born November 13, 1947) is a Canadian poet and novelist. He served as Canadian Parliamentary Poet Laureate from 2006 to 2008.

== Biography ==
John Steffler was born in Toronto, Ontario, on November 13, 1947, and grew up in a rural area near Thornhill. He obtained a B.A. (Honours) in English from University College, University of Toronto, in 1971, and an M.A. in English (1974) from the University of Guelph, with a thesis titled "The Origin and Development of Los: a Study of the Prophetic Poetry of William Blake". He taught at the Department of English, Sir Wilfred Grenfell College, from 1975 until 2006. He has served as writer-in-residence and part-time faculty at University of New Brunswick, University of Guelph, and Concordia University, and has facilitated workshops with the Banff Centre and Sage Hill writing programs. After leaving Newfoundland in 2006, Steffler lived in Montreal until 2008, and until 2019 divided his time between Montreal and rural Ontario, where he lives with his wife, poet Susan Gillis.

== Bibliography ==
=== Poetry ===
- An Explanation of Yellow. Ottawa: Borealis Press, 1981.
- The Grey Islands. Toronto: McClelland and Stewart, 1985.
- The Wreckage of Play. Toronto: McClelland and Stewart, 1988.
- That Night We Were Ravenous. Toronto: McClelland and Stewart, 1998.
- The Grey Islands. London, ON: Brick Books, 2000.
- Helix: new and selected poems. Montreal : Signal Editions, 2002.
- The Grey Islands, unabridged audio edition (2007)
- Lookout. Plattsburgh, NY: McClelland and Stewart, 2010. ISBN 978-0-7710-8267-2 (shortlisted for the 2011 Griffin Poetry Prize)
- Forty-One Pages: On Poetry, Language and Wilderness. Regina: University of Regina Press, 2019.
- And Yet. Toronto: McClelland and Stewart, 2020.

=== Novels ===
- The Afterlife of George Cartwright. Toronto: McClelland and Stewart, 1992. New York: Henry Holt & Co., 1993.
- German Mills: A Novel Pertaining to the Life and Times of William Berczy. Gaspereau Press, 2015.

=== Children's books ===
- Flights of Magic. Victoria: Press Porcepic, 1987.

=== Anthologies ===
- Coastlines: The Poetry of Atlantic Canada, ed. Anne Compton, Laurence Hutchman, Ross Leckie and Robin McGrath (Goose Lane Editions, 2002)

Except where noted, bibliographical information courtesy Canadian Poetry Online.
