= Daphne Marlatt =

Canadian poet and novelist

- Born: Daphne Buckle; July 11, 1942 (age 84); Melbourne, Victoria, Australia
- Education: University of British Columbia (BA); Indiana University (MA)
- Occupations: Novelist; poet

Daphne Marlatt (née Buckle, July 11, 1942) is a Canadian poet and novelist who lives in Vancouver, British Columbia.

Her works include novels, poetry, and edited literary journals and magazines. In 2006, she was made a Member of the Order of Canada.

== Life and work ==
=== Early life ===
Daphne Marlatt was born to English parents, Arthur and Edrys Lupprian Buckle, in Melbourne, Australia on July 11, 1942. When she was three, Marlatt's family moved to Penang, Malaysia, and then when she was nine her family immigrated to Vancouver. Marlatt received her BA from the University of British Columbia in 1964. While there, in 1963, she had also become an editor for TISH, a Canadian literary journal.

In 1963, she had also married clinical psychologist G. Alan Marlatt, with whom she settled in Bloomington, Indiana. She received her MA in comparative literature from the Indiana University in 1968. There, she started to write her first book of poetry Frames of a Story (1968), which Robert Lecker called her "initial attempt to formulate a poetry which would establish a correlation between perception and articulation."

In 1969, Marlatt published leaf leaf/s, which is a collection of shorter poems. In 1971, Marlatt published Rings, a collection of poems about pregnancy, birth, and early parenting. She started teaching writing and literature at Capilano College and also edited for The Capilano Review. In 1972 she published Vancouver Poems. Marlatt published a well-known piece of hers, Steveston, in 1974. Steveston is about a small fishing village that was an interment camp for Japanese Canadians during World War II.

=== Later life ===
In 1975, Marlatt published Our Lives, a poetry piece. In 1977, The Story, She Said was published and so was her book Zócalo. Zócalo is a collection of long poems about travels through the Yucatán Peninsula. Also in 1977, Marlatt co-founded periodies: a magazine of prose (1977–81). Marlatt's What Matters: Writing 1968-1970 consists of some of her early writings and was published in 1980. Also in 1980, she had Net Work: Selected Writing published, edited by Fred Wah. In 1981 she published here & there. Marlatt and her partner since 1974, the poet and artist Roy Kiyooka, separated in 1982.

Marlatt also co-founded the West Coast Women and Words Society in 1982. In 1983, Marlatt's How Hug a Stone was published, which follows her journey with her son in 1981 to England. In 1984, Touch to My Tongue was published. Both pieces "express her intense apprehension of the continually changing world." It was around this time that Marlatt became more involved in feminist concerns, and attended and organized several feminist conferences. She also, in 1985, co-founded Tessera, a feminist journal, and periodies: a magazine of prose. Around this time, she came out as a lesbian.

Marlatt co-wrote two books, Mauve (1985) and character/jeu de letters (1986), with Quebec feminist writer Nicole Brossard. Double negative, a piece co-created by Marlatt and her partner Betsy Warland, was published in 1988.

In 1988, one of Marlatt's most well-received pieces, Ana Historic, was published. The novel follows the protagonist, Annie, herself writing a novel about women's historic and contemporary experiences. Marlatt described her process for Ana Historic in a 2003 interview: "I like the friction that is produced between the stark reporting of document, the pseudo-factual language of journalism, and the more emotional, even poetic, language of memory. That's why I used such a hodgepodge of sources in Ana Historic". According to Caroline Rosenthal, author of Narrative Deconstructions of Gender in Works by Audrey Thomas, Daphne Marlatt, and Louise Erdrich, "Marlatt, in Ana Historic, challenges the regulatory fiction of heterosexuality. She offers her protagonist a way out into a new order that breaks with the law of the father, creating a 'monstrous' text that explores the possibilities of a lesbian identity."

In 1991, Marlatt's piece, Salvage, was published. It explores parts of Marlatt's life from a feminist point of view. In 1993 Ghost Works was published, which combines prose poems, letters, diary entries, short-line poems, and travel books to make a narrative. In 1994, Two Women in a Birth was published. This piece was once again co-written by Marlatt and Warland and represents their relationship and collaborative work over the previous decade.

In 1996, Marlatt's second novel, Taken, was published. This novel is a tribute to women whose lives have been destroyed by war. In 2001, This Tremor Love Is was published. This Tremor Love is a collection of love poems from the previous twenty-five years. Marlatt's collection of poetry Seven Glass Bowls was published in 2003.

In 2006, Marlatt and her work were the subject of an episode of the television series Heart of a Poet, produced by Canadian filmmaker Maureen Judge. Marlatt appeared on the recording Like Light Off Water, released by Otter Bay in 2008, reading passages from her poetry cycle Steveston with music by Canadian composers Robert Minden and Carla Hallett.

Marlatt has taught at several colleges and universities, including the University of Alberta, the University of British Columbia, Capilano College, the University of Calgary, the University of Manitoba, McMaster University, Mount Royal College, the University of Saskatchewan, Simon Fraser University, the University of Victoria, and the University of Western Ontario.

Marlatt is a student of the Gelug school of Tibetan Buddhism, and currently lives in Vancouver, British Columbia.

== Awards and accolades ==
Marlatt was made a Member of the Order of Canada for her contributions to Canadian literature in 2006.

She received the Vancouver Mayor’s Arts Awards for Literary Arts in 2008. Also in 2008, she won the Dorothy Livesay Poetry Prize for The Given.

In 2012, she received the George Woodcock Lifetime Achievement Award.

In May 2026, Marlatt received an honorary degree from the University of British Columbia.

== Bibliography ==
- Frames of a Story - 1968
- leaf leaf/s - 1969
- Rings - 1971
- Vancouver Poems - 1972
- Steveston - 1974 (photographs by Robert Minden)
- Our Lives - 1975
- Zócalo - 1977
- The Story, She Said - 1977
- Opening Doors: Vancouver's East End - 1979 (edited with Carole Itter)
- Net Work: Selected Writing - 1980
- What Matters: Writing 1968-70 - 1980
- here & there - 1981
- How Hug a Stone - 1983
- Touch to My Tongue - 1984
- Mauve - 1985 (with Nicole Brossard)
- character/jeu de letters - 1986 (with Nicole Brossard)
- Feminist Literature in the Feminine - 1985 (edited with Ann Dybikowski, Victoria Freeman, Barbara Pulling, and Betsy Warland)
- double negative - 1988 (with Betsy Warland)
- Ana Historic - 1988
- Telling It: Women and Language Across Cultures - 1990 (with Betsy Warland, Lee Maracle, and Sky Lee)
- Salvage - 1991
- Ghost Works - 1993
- Two Women in a Birth - 1994 (with Betsy Warland)
- Taken - 1996
- Readings from the Labyrinth - 1998
- Winter/Rice/Tea Strain - 2000
- This Tremor Love Is - 2001
- Seven Glass Bowls - 2003
- The Given - 2008
- The Gull - 2009
- Opening Doors in Vancouver's East End: Strathcona - 2010 (edited with Carole Itter)
- Liquidities: Vancouver Poems Then and Now - 2013
- Rivering: The Poetry of Daphne Marlatt - 2014 (edited by Susan Knutson)
- Intertidal - 2017 (edited by Susan Holbrook)

== See also ==
- Canadian literature
- Canadian poetry
- List of Canadian poets
