= Fred Wah =

Canadian poet, novelist, scholar, and former laureate

- Born: Frederick James Wah; January 23, 1939 (age 87); Swift Current, Saskatchewan, Canada
- Education: University of British Columbia
- Occupations: Novelist; poet

Frederick James Wah, OC, (born January 23, 1939) is a Canadian poet, novelist, scholar and former Canadian Parliamentary Poet Laureate.

== Life ==
Wah was born in Swift Current, Saskatchewan, but grew up in the interior (West Kootenay) of British Columbia. His father was born in Canada and raised in China, the son of a Chinese father and a Scots-Irish mother. Wah's mother was a Swedish-born Canadian who came to Canada at age 6. His diverse ethnic makeup figures significantly in his writings.

Wah studied literature and music at the University of British Columbia. While there, he was a founding editor and contributor to TISH. He later did graduate work at the University of New Mexico in Albuquerque and University at Buffalo, The State University of New York. He has taught at Selkirk College, David Thompson University Centre, and the University of Calgary. Well known for his work on literary journals and small-press, Wah has been a contributing editor to Open Letter since its beginning, involved in the editing of West Coast Line, and with Frank Davey edited the world's first online literary magazine, SwiftCurrent. Wah won the 'Governor General's Award' for his 1985 book "Waiting for Saskatchewan".

Wah retired after 40 years of teaching and lives in Vancouver, British Columbia with his wife Pauline Butling. He remains active writing and performing public readings of his poetry. From 2006 to 2007, he served as the Writer-in-Residence at Simon Fraser University in Burnaby, British Columbia.

On December 20, 2011, Wah was appointed as Canada's Parliamentary Poet Laureate. He is the fifth poet to hold this office. In 2013 he was made an Officer in the Order of Canada.

== Education ==
- Bachelor of Arts - English Literature and Music - University of British Columbia
- Master of Arts - Literature and Linguistics - University at Buffalo, The State University of New York

== Awards ==
- Waiting for Saskatchewan - 1985 (1985 Governor General's Award for poetry)
- So Far - 1991 (1982 Stephanson Award for Poetry)
- Diamond Grill - 1996 (Writers Guild of Alberta Howard O'Hagan Prize for Short Fiction)
- Faking It - 2001 (Association for Canadian and Québec Literatures Gabrielle Roy Prize for Criticism)
- Is A Door - 2010 (Dorothy Livesay B.C. Book Prize for poetry)
- A Door to Be Kicked - 2023 (National Community Radio Award for Best in Podcasting)

== Bibliography ==
- Lardeau (1965)
- Mountain (1967)
- Among (1972)
- Tree (1972)
- Earth (1974)
- Pictograms from the Interior of B.C. (1975)
- Selected Poems: Loki is Buried at Smoky Creek (1980)
- Owners Manual (1981)
- Breathin' My Name With a Sigh Talonbooks, 1981, ISBN 9780889221888
- Grasp The Sparrow's Tail (1982)
- Waiting for Saskatchewan Turnstone Press Canada, 1985, ISBN 9780888011008
- The Swift Current Anthology (1986; edited with Frank Davey)
- Rooftops (1987)
- Music at the Heart of Thinking (1987)
- Limestone Lakes Utaniki (1989)
- So Far (1991)
- Alley Alley Home Free (1992)
- Diamond Grill Edmonton: NeWest Press, 1996; NeWest, 2006, ISBN 9781897126110
- Faking It: Poetics and Hybridity Critical Writing 1984-1999. NeWest Press, 2000, ISBN 9781896300078
- Isadora Blue (La Mano Izquierda Impressora, Victoria, 2005)
- Articulations (Nomados, Vancouver, 2007)
- Sentenced to Light (2008)
- is a door Talonbooks, 2009. ISBN 9780889226203
- Permissions: Tish Poetics 1963 Thereafter- (Vancouver: Ronsdale Press, 2014) 33 pp. ISBN 9781553803294
- Scree: The Collected Earlier Poems 1962-1991 (Vancouver: Talonbooks, 2015) 633 pp. ISBN 9780889229488
- Music at the Heart of Thinking a poetry collection published in July 2020.
- A Door to be Kicked: A Radio Play by Fred Wah a radio play script authored by Fred Wah based on the Diamond Grill. The radio play was produced and recorded by Kootenay Co-op Radio in February 2022 and won the 2023 National Community Radio Best in Podcasting Award.

== Criticism ==
- Banting, Pamela. Body Inc.: A Theory of Translation Poetics. Winnipeg: Turnstone Press, 1995.
- Diehl-Jones, Charlene. Fred Wah and His Works. Toronto: ECW Press, 1996.
- Louis Cabri, ed. (2009). The False Laws of Narrative: The Poetry of Fred Wah. Wilfrid Laurier Univ. Press. ISBN 978-1-55458-046-0.
- John Z. Ming Chen: The Influence of Daoism on Asian-Canadian Writers. Mellen, 2008.

| Preceded by Pierre DesRuisseaux | Parliamentary Poet Laureate; 2011–2013 | Succeeded by Michel Pleau |
