= George Bowering =

Canadian writer (born 1935)

- Born: George Harry Bowering; December 1, 1935 (age 90); Penticton, British Columbia, Canada
- Occupations: Novelist; poet; historian; biographer
- Website: georgebowering.com

George Harry Bowering, OC OBC (born December 1, 1935) is a prolific Canadian novelist, poet, historian, and biographer. He was the first Canadian Parliamentary Poet Laureate.

== Life and career ==
Bowering was born in Penticton, British Columbia, and raised in the nearby town of Oliver, where his father was a high-school chemistry teacher.

Bowering lives in Vancouver, British Columbia, and is Professor Emeritus at Simon Fraser University, where he worked for 30 years. Never having written as an adherent of organized religion, he in the past wryly described himself as a Baptist agnostic. In 2002, Bowering was appointed the first ever Canadian Parliamentary Poet Laureate. That same year, he was made an Officer of the Order of Canada. He was awarded the Order of British Columbia in 2004.

When the Indian Hungryalist, also known as Hungry generation, poet Malay Roy Choudhury, was arrested at Kolkata, India, Bowering brought out a special issue of Imago for helping the Indian poet in his trial.

Bowering was one of the judges for the 2008 Griffin Poetry Prize.

== Bibliography ==
=== Novels ===
- 1967: Mirror on the Floor, Toronto: McClelland & Stewart; Vancouver: Anvil Press, 2014
- 1973: Fiddler's Night, Vancouver: Dos Equis
- 1977: A Short Sad Book, Vancouver: Talonbooks; Vancouver: New Star Books, 2017
- 1980: Burning Water, Toronto: Musson Book Company; Vancouver: New Star Books, 2007
  - French edition: En eaux troubles, translated by L.-Philippe Hébert, Montreal: Quinze, 1982
- 1988: Caprice, Toronto/New York: Penguin; Vancouver: New Star Books, 2010
- 1990: Harry's Fragments, Vancouver: Talonbooks
- 1994: Shoot!, Toronto: Key Porter Books; Vancouver: New Star Books, 2008
- 1998: Piccolo Mondo (with Angela Bowering, Michael Matthews & David Bromige), Toronto: Couch House Books
- 2012: Pinboy, Toronto: Cormorant Books
- 2015: Writing the Okanagan, Vancouver: Talonbooks
- 2018: No One, Toronto: ECW Press

=== Short fiction ===
- 1974: Flycatcher and Other Stories, Ottawa: Oberon Press
- 1977: Concentric Circles, Windsor: Black Moss Press
- 1978: Protective Footwear, Toronto: McClelland & Stewart
- 1983: A Place to Die, Ottawa: Oberon Press
- 1994: The Rain Barrel, Vancouver: Talonbooks
- 2004: Standing on Richards, Toronto: Viking, the title story was reprinted in 2005 in Vancouver Stories: West Coast Fiction from Canada's Best Writers. Vancouver: Raincoast Books.
- 2009: The Box, Vancouver: New Star Books
- 2015: Ten Women, Vancouver: Anvil Press

=== Young adult fiction ===
- 1994: Parents from Space, Montreal: Roussan
- 1998: Diamondback Dog, Montreal: Roussan
- 2015: Attack of the Toga Gang, Toronto: Dancing Cat Books

=== Book-length poems ===
- 1967: Baseball, Toronto: Coach House Books
- 1970: George, Vancouver, Kitchener, Weed/Flower
- 1971: Geneve, Toronto: Coach House Books
- 1972: Autobiology, Vancouver: New Star Books, 1972; Vancouver, Pooka Press, 2006
- 1972: Curious, Toronto: Coach House Books
- 1974: At War With the U.S., Vancouver: Talonbooks
- 1976: Allophanes, Toronto: Coach House Books
- 1982: Ear Reach, Vancouver: Alcuin
- 1984: Kerrisdale Elegies, Toronto: Coach House Books; Vancouver, Pooka Press, 2008; Vancouver: Talonbooks, 2008
  - Italian edition: Elegie di Kerrisdale, translated by Annalisa Goldoni, Rome: Edizioni Empiria, 1996
- 2000: His Life: a poem, Toronto: ECW Press
- 2010: My Darling Nellie Grey, Vancouver: Talonbooks
- 2019: Taking Measures, Vancouver: Talonbooks

=== Collections of poems (including gathered long poems) ===
- 1963: Sticks & Stones, Vancouver: Tishbooks; Vancouver: Talonbooks, 1989
- 1964: Points on the Grid, Toronto: Contact Press
- 1965: The Man in Yellow Boots/ El hombre de las botas amarillas, Mexico: Ediciones El Corno
- 1966: The Silver Wire, Kingston, Quarry Press
- 1969: Rocky Mountain Foot, Toronto: McClelland & Stewart
- 1969: The Gangs of Kosmos, Toronto: House of Anansi Press
- 1971: Touch: selected poems 1960-1969, Toronto: McClelland & Stewart
- 1974: In the Flesh, Toronto: McClelland & Stewart
- 1976: The Catch, Toronto: McClelland & Stewart
- 1976: Poem & Other Baseballs, Windsor: Black Moss Press
- 1977: The Concrete Island, Montreal: Véhicule Press
- 1979: Another Mouth, Toronto: McClelland & Stewart
- 1981: Particular Accidents: selected poems, Vancouver: Talonbooks
- 1982: West Window: selected poetry, Toronto: General
- 1982: Smoking Mirror, Edmonton: Longspoon
- 1985: Seventy-One Poems for People, Red Deer: RDC Press
- 1986: Delayed Mercy & other poems, Toronto: Coach House Books
- 1992: Urban Snow, Vancouver: Talonbooks
- 1993: George Bowering Selected: Poems 1961-1992, Toronto: McClelland & Stewart
- 1997: Blonds on Bikes, Vancouver: Talonbooks
- 2004: Changing on the Fly, Vancouver, Polestar Press
- 2006: Vermeer's Light: Poems 1996-2006, Vancouver, Talonbooks
- 2013: Teeth: Poems 2006-2011, Toronto: Mansfield Press
- 2015: The World, I Guess, Vancouver: New Star Books
- 2018: Some End, Vancouver: New Star Books

=== Criticism ===
- 1970: Al Purdy, Toronto: Copp Clark
- 1971: Robert Duncan: an Interview, Toronto: Coach House/Beaver Kosmos
- 1979: Three Vancouver Writers, Toronto: Open Letter/Coach House
- 1982: A Way With Words, Ottawa: Oberon Press
- 1983: The Mask in Place, Winnipeg: Turnstone Press
- 1985: Craft Slices, Ottawa: Oberon Press
- 1988: Errata, Red Deer: RDC Press
- 1988: Imaginary Hand, Edmonton: NeWest Press
- 2005: Left Hook, Vancouver: Raincoast Books
- 2010: Horizontal Surfaces, Toronto: BookThug
- 2012: Words, Words, Words, Vancouver: New Star Books
- 2019: Writing and Reading, Vancouver: New Star Books

=== Chapbooks ===
- 1967: How I Hear Howl, Montreal: Beaver Kosmos
- 1969: Two Police Poems, Vancouver: Talonbooks
- 1972: The Sensible, Toronto: Massasauga
- 1973: Layers 1-13, Kitchener: Weed/Flower
- 1977: In Answer, Vancouver: William Hoffer
- 1980: Uncle Louis, Toronto: Coach House Books
- 1985: Spencer & Groulx, Vancouver: William Hoffer
- 1991: Quarters, Prince George: Gorse Press (Winner, bp Nichol chapbook award 1991)
- 1992: Do Sink, Vancouver: Pomflit (Winner, bp Nichol chapbook award, 1992).
- 1992: Sweetly, Vancouver: Wuz
- 1997: Blondes on Bikes, Ottawa: Above Ground
- 1998: A, You're Adorable, Ottawa: Above Ground
- 2000: 6 Little Poems in Alphabetical Order, Calgary: House Press
- 2001: Some Writers, Calgary: House Press
- 2002: Joining the Lost Generation, Calgary: House Press
- 2004: Lost in the Library, Ellsworth, ME: Backwoods Broadsides
- 2005: Rewriting my Grandfather, Vancouver: Nomados
- 2006: Crows in the Wind, Toronto: BookThug
- 2006: A Knot of Light, Calgary: No Press
- 2007: Montenegro 1966, Calgary: No Press
- 2007: U.S. Sonnets, Vancouver: Pooka Press
- 2007: Eggs in There, Edmonton: Rubicon
- 2007: Some Answers, Mt. Pleasant, ON: LaurelReed Books
- 2007: Horizontal Surfaces, Edmonton: Olive Collective
- 2007: Tocking Heads, Edmonton: above/ground
- 2008: There Then, Prince George: Gorse Press
- 2008: Animals, Beasts, Critters, Vancouver: JB Objects
- 2008: Valley, Calgary: No Press
- 2008: Fulgencio, Vancouver: Nomados
- 2008: According to Brueghel, North Vancouver: Capilano
- 2008: Shall I Compare, Penticton: Beaver Kosmos
- 2009: A Little Black Strap, St. Paul: Unarmed
- 2013: Los Pájaros de Tenacatita, Ootischenia: Nose-in-Book
- 2016: Sitting in Jalisco, Ootischenia: Nose-in-Book
- 2016: That Toddlin Town, Ottawa: above/ground books
- 2019: David in Byzantium, Cobourg: Proper Tales Press

=== Memoirs ===
- 1993: The Moustache: Memories of Greg Curnoe, Toronto: Coach House Books
- 2001: A Magpie Life, Toronto: Key Porter
- 2002: Cars, Toronto: Coach House Books
- 2006: Baseball Love, Vancouver: Talonbooks
- 2011: How I Wrote Certain of my Books, Toronto: Mansfield Press
- 2016: The Hockey Scribbler, Toronto: ECW Press
- 2016: The Dad Dialogues (with Charles Demers), Vancouver: Arsenal Pulp Press

=== History ===
- 1996: Bowering's B.C., Toronto: Viking
- 1999: Bowering, George (1999). Egotists and Autocrats: The Prime Ministers of Canada. Toronto, New York City: Viking. ISBN 978-0-670-88081-2. OCLC 45066615. Also published in 2000 by Penguin. ISBN 978-0-14-027550-6. OCLC 44545832.
- 2003: Stone Country, Toronto: Viking

=== Plays ===
- 1962: "The Home for Heroes", Vancouver: Prism
- 1966: "What Does Eddie Williams Want?", Montreal: CBC-TV
- 1972: "George Vancouver", Vancouver: CBC radio network
- 1973: "Sitting in Mexico", Vancouver: CBC radio network
- 1986: "Music in the Park", Vancouver: CBC radio network
- 1989: "The Great Grandchildren of Bill Bissett's Mice", Vancouver: CBC radio network

=== Editions ===
- The 1962 Poems of R.S. Lane, Toronto: Ganglia Press, 1965
- Vibrations: poems of youth, Toronto, Gage, 1970
- The Story so Far, Toronto, Coach House, 1972
- The City in her Eyes by David Cull, Vancouver: Vancouver Community Press, 1972
- Imago Twenty, Vancouver, Talonbooks, 1974
- Cityflowers by Artie Gold, Montreal: Delta Canada, 1974
- Letters from Geeksville: letters from Red Lane 1960-64, Prince George: Caledonia Writing Series, 1976
- Great Canadian Sports Stories, Ottawa: Oberon Press, 1979
- Fiction of Contemporary Canada, Toronto: Coach House Books, 1980
- Loki is Buried at Smoky Creek: selected poems of Fred Wah, Vancouver: Talonbooks, 1981
- My Body was Eaten by Dogs: selected poems of David McFadden, Toronto: McClelland & Stewart, New York: CrossCountry, 1981
- "1945-1980," in Introduction to Poetry: British, American, Canadian, David and Lecker, Toronto: Holt, Rinehart, and Winston, 1981
- The Contemporary Canadian Poem Anthology, Toronto: Coach House Books, 1983
- Sheila Watson and The Double Hook: the artist and her critics, Ottawa: Golden Dog Press, 1984
- Taking the Field:the best of baseball fiction, Red Deer: RDC Press, 1990
- Likely Stories: a postmodern sampler (with Linda Hutcheon), Toronto: Coach House Books, 1992
- An H in the Heart: Selected works of bpNichol (with Michael Ondaatje), Toronto: McClelland & Stewart, 1994
- And Other Stories, Vancouver: Talonbooks, 2001
- The 2008 Griffin Poetry Prize Anthology, Toronto: House of Anansi, 2008
- The Heart Does Break (with Jean Baird), Toronto: Random House, 2009

=== Editor ===
- Tish, Vancouver, 1961–63
- Imago, Calgary, London, Montreal, Vancouver, 1964-1974
- Beaver Kosmos Folios, Calgary, London, Montreal, Vancouver, 1966–75.

=== About ===
- A Record of Writing: an annotated and Illustrated Bibliography of George Bowering by Roy Miki, Vancouver: Talonbooks, 1989
- Essays on Canadian Writing, George Bowering issue ed. Ken Norris, 1989
- George Bowering: Bright Circles of Colour by Eva-Marie Kroller, Vancouver: Talonbooks, 1992
- George Bowering and His Works by John Harris, Toronto: ECW Press, 1992
- 71 (+) for GB ed. Jean Baird, David McFadden and George Stanley, Vancouver/Toronto: (printed at) Coach House Books, 2005
- He Speaks Volumes: A Biography of George Bowering by Rebecca Wigod, Vancouver: Talonbooks, 2018

Preceded by None	Parliamentary Poet Laureate; 2002–2004	Succeeded by Pauline Michel
