= O-blek =

Defunct American literary magazine

o•blék: a journal of language arts (pronounced exactly like the word "oblique") was a small literary magazine founded by Peter Gizzi who co-edited it with Connell McGrath. The magazine published a number of poems often not in the mainstream but recognized for their excellence (by, for instance, being selected for The Best American Poetry series). The magazine ran from 1987 to 1993.

Published by The Garlic Press in Stockbridge, Massachusetts, the magazine offered readers no mission statement, editor's notes or biographic notes on contributors. At the beginning of each issue it instead presented different dictionary entries for the word "oblique".

o•blék focused on publishing poets away from the mainstream and associated with various types and schools of poetry. Poets often associated with Language poetry frequently appeared, including Clark Coolidge, Lyn Hejinian, and Michael Palmer. Other frequent contributors were Fanny Howe, Robert Creeley, Rosmarie Waldrop, Edmond Jabès, and John Wieners, Ben Marcus, Cole Swensen, Roberto Tejada, Mark McMorris, and Elizabeth Willis. Other contributors are associated with the New York School tradition: Ted Berrigan, Kenward Elmslie, Bernadette Mayer, Charles North, Alice Notley, Ron Padgett, David Shapiro, Marjorie Welish, and John Yau.

== History ==
The first issue of the magazine was dated April 1987. The publication was put out at a cost of about $4,100 with borrowed money and sold out its run of 1,000 copies after about 18 months. At the end of its first year, the magazine had about 75 subscribers, a number which rose to 275 after six years (not including libraries, which mostly subscribed through jobbers).

Gizzi has written that "in the mid to late 80's [...] I was waiting tables and reading books and editing my journal, o-blek". With the sacrifices, Gizzi has said, came success. The journal received numerous grants, is in the permanent collections of major libraries, and continues to be cited in poetry criticism.

In 1990 o•blék was the focus of the seventh International Literary Conference at the Fondation Royaumont in France. Poets and critics attended from all over France to discuss the journal and independent literary production.

With the publication of the twelfth issue in 1993, the magazine had put out more than 2,500 pages of contemporary poetry from three generations of poets.

In 1993, Gizzi left the publication, turning it over to others, although no further issues were published. By early 1995 the magazine was being folded up.

== Spelling and punctuation of the magazine's name ==
The name of the magazine is supposed to appear as it does in some dictionaries showing the pronunciation of "oblique" — with a lower-case "o", a bullet, and an accent over the "e". It has been represented at the Best American Poetry Web site as "o.blek" but most other citations use a hyphen. Most other citations of the magazine punctuate it with a hyphen after the "o" and with no accent: "o-blek" Citations are nearly universal in not capitalizing the first letter in the name.

== Editorial philosophy ==
Speaking as part of a panel discussion at a 1993 poetry conference, editor Connell McGrath described some of the editors' principles in running the magazine. McGrath said:

The principles behind o•blék are that we try to present work as faithfully as possible according to typescript. The second principle is that we try to exclusively accept work only on the basis of our own taste. I find I've seen in the past a lot of publications that operate in terms of trying to represent something or do something specific and I think that that's fine but I think that the most powerful things I've seen are things that admit personal taste as the only basis to make that decision on.

At another point, McGrath said:

What I see happening for us is that we can get sidetracked, I can get sidetracked by questions of fame, for instance, if so and so is a good poet—you [to panel moderator Jefferson Hansen, editor of Poetic Briefs] did a little thing in the story that Mr. Schmo sent in about a famous poet sending in a bad poem and publishing it anyway and there's enormous temptation in that and we try not to do it. Sometimes we do do it anyway. And then there are also other considerations, considerations of friendship, anyone who's been an editor for any amount of time knows it's easy to hurt people's feelings and make enemies and I don't like to do that myself but it happens anyway. So there are other considerations that seem to sidetrack me from this principle.

== Issues ==
The first 11 issues were published on almost square pages; the twelfth was much larger, in two volumes.

=== o•blék/1 ===
Contributors: along with Peter and his brother Michael Gizzi, these included: Anne-Marie Albiach, Bruce Andrews, Clark Coolidge, Michael Gizzi, Emmanuel Hocquard, Edmond Jabès, Paul Metcalf, Michael Palmer, Ray Ragosta, Robert Tejada, Keith Waldrop, Rosmarie Waldrop, Marjorie Welsh John Yau, and Geoffrey Young,

The first edition, printed in April 1987, was 142 pages long, with a press run of 1,000 copies.

=== Other issues ===
- o•blék/2 — 1987 Work by Rae Armantrout, Barbara Guest, Clark Coolidge, Scalapino, John Yau, Bernstein, Ott and others.
- o•blék/3 —
- o•blék/4 — 1988 Contributors Bernadette Meyer, Robert Creeley, Kenward Elmslie, Clark Coolidge, Paul Metcalf, John Yau, Gil Ott, William Corbett
- o•blék/5 — 1989, dedicated to the editors of Locus Solus and with a New York School focus. Contributors: John Ashbery, Bill Berkson, Joseph Ceravalo, Clark Coolidge, Barbara Guest, Lyn Hejinian, Jena Osman, James Schuyler, a collaboration between Kenneth Koch and Frank O'Hara, cover by Trevor Winkfield. "Limited to 1000 copies" 236 pp.
- o•blék/6 —
- o•blék/7 — Spring 1990, 187 pp.
- o•blék/8 — 1990
- o•blék/9 — 1991 dedicated to Keith and Rosmarie Waldrop's Burning Deck Press
- o•blék/10 —
- o•blék/11 — 1992

=== o•blék/12 ===
Brought out in 1993, as a two-volume set, the twelfth issue had a total of 600 pages and was titled, Writing from the New Coast, with one volume further titled Presentation and another Technique. It focused on new and emerging writers. Technique, was edited by Gizzi and poet Juliana Spahr, and much of its contents ultimately came from a conference held at the State University of New York at Buffalo. Contributors include Lee Ann Brown and Jessica Grim.

From Gizzi's foreword:

We are the generation of artists that grew up with a photograph of the earth tacked to our walls. When that first image of the earth was sent back in 1959 our conception of this place was changed materially. No longer was it to be a world so defined by our ancestors; in that swift shutter and instant transmission it became worlds, peoples, and languages. All boundaries or clear definitions of identity are eroded, active and blurred. Simone Weil said "You could not be born at a better period than the present, when we have lost everything." We live in this space of multiplicity where the ability to construct a single world with shared aspirations, sensitivities and imagination is not only improbable but impossible. Yet it is poetry's function to aspire to the impossible, because poetry works through a human agency – the generosity of a reader and a writer. Poetry demands that a risk be taken, and from this act of intelligence courage claims precedence over poverty of spirit.
