= 20th-century French literature =

Literature-related events in France during the 20th century

20th-century French literature is literature written in French from 1900 to 1999. For literature made after 1999, see the article Contemporary French literature. Many of the developments in French literature in this period parallel changes in the visual arts. For more on this, see French art of the 20th century.

== Overview ==
French literature was profoundly shaped by the historical events of the century and was also shaped by—and a contributor to—the century's political, philosophical, moral, and artistic crises.

This period spans the last decades of the Third Republic (1871–1940) (including World War I), the period of World War II (the German occupation and the Vichy–1944), the provisional French government (1944–1946) the Fourth Republic (1946–1958) and the Fifth Republic (1959–). Important historical events for French literature include: the Dreyfus Affair; French colonialism and imperialism in Africa, the Far East (French Indochina) and the Pacific; the Algerian War of Independence (1954–1962); the important growth of the French Communist Party; the rise of Fascism in Europe; the events of May 1968. For more on French history, see History of France.

Twentieth century French literature did not undergo an isolated development and reveals the influence of writers and genres from around the world, including Walt Whitman, Fyodor Dostoyevsky, Franz Kafka, John Dos Passos, Ernest Hemingway, William Faulkner, Luigi Pirandello, the British and American detective novel, James Joyce, Jorge Luis Borges, Bertolt Brecht and many others. In turn, French literature has also had a radical impact on world literature.

Because of the creative spirit of the French literary and artistic movements at the beginning of the century, France gained the reputation as being the necessary destination for writers and artists. Important foreign writers who have lived and worked in France (especially Paris) in the twentieth century include: Oscar Wilde, Gertrude Stein, Ernest Hemingway, William S. Burroughs, Henry Miller, Anaïs Nin, James Joyce, Samuel Beckett, Julio Cortázar, Vladimir Nabokov, Edith Wharton and Eugène Ionesco. Some of the most important works of the century in French were written by foreign authors (Eugène Ionesco, Samuel Beckett).

For Americans in the 1920s and 1930s (including the so-called "Lost Generation"), part of the fascination with France was also linked to freedom from Prohibition. For African-Americans in the twentieth century (such as James Baldwin), France was also more accepting of race and permitted greater freedom (in a similar way, Jazz was embraced by the French faster than in some areas in America). A similar sense of freedom from political oppression or from intolerance (such as anti-homosexual discrimination) has drawn other authors and writers to France. France has also been more permissive in terms of censorship, and many important foreign language novels were originally published in France while being banned in America: Joyce's Ulysses (published by Sylvia Beach in Paris, 1922), Vladimir Nabokov's Lolita and William S. Burroughs's Naked Lunch (both published by Olympia Press), and Henry Miller's Tropic of Cancer (published by Obelisk Press).

== From 1895 to 1914 ==
The early years of the century (often called the "Belle Époque") saw radical experiments in all genres and Symbolism and Naturalism underwent profound changes.

Alfred Jarry united symbolism with elements from marionette theater and a kind of proto-surrealism. The stage was further radicalised both in the direction of expressionism (the "théâtre de l'oeuvre" of Aurélien Lugné-Poe) and hyper-realism (the theater of André Antoine). The theater director Jacques Copeau emphasized training an actor to be a complete person and rejected the Italian stage for something closer to the Elizabethan model, and his vision would have a profound impact on the "Cartel" of the 1920s and 1930s (see below).

Guillaume Apollinaire radicalized the Baudelairian poetic exploration of modern life in evoking planes, the Eiffel Tower and urban wastelands, and he brought poetry into contact with cubism through his Calligrammes, a form of visual poetry. Inspired by Rimbaud, Paul Claudel used a form of free verse to explore his mystical conversion to Catholicism. Other poets from this period include: Paul Valéry, Max Jacob (a key member of the group around Apollinaire), Pierre Jean Jouve (a follower of Romain Rolland's "Unanism"), Valery Larbaud (a translator of Whitman and friend to Joyce), Victor Segalen (friend to Huysmans and Claudel), Léon-Paul Fargue (who studied with Stéphane Mallarmé and was close to Valéry and Larbaud).

In the novel, André Gide's early works, especially L'Immoraliste (1902), pursue the problems of freedom and sensuality that symbolism had posed; Alain-Fournier's 1913 novel Le Grand Meaulnes is a deeply felt portrait of a nostalgic past.

But radical experimentation was not appreciated by all literary and artistic circles in the early 20th century. Popular and bourgeois tastes were relatively conservative. The poetic dramas of Edmond Rostand, especially Cyrano de Bergerac in 1897, were immensely popular at the start of the 20th century, as too the "well-made" plays and bourgeois farces of Georges Feydeau. Anatole France, Maurice Barrès, Paul Bourget were leading authors of the period who employed fiction as a convenient vehicle for ideas about men and things. The tradition of the Balzac and Zola inspired roman-fleuve continued to exert a profound attraction, as in Romain Rolland's Jean-Christophe (1906–1912). Paul Léautaud (1872–1956) was the author of a highly original personal diary chronicling the life of the Parisian literary world in the first half of the 20th century in his monumental 13-volume "Journal Littéraire", considered to be "the greatest study of character ever written" by Mavis Gallant, and "more devastating in its truthfulness than the Confessions of Rousseau" by his biographer James Harding.

Popular fiction and genre fiction at the start of the 20th century also included detective fiction, like the mysteries of the author and journalist Gaston Leroux who is credited with the first "locked-room puzzle" -- The Mystery of the Yellow Room, featuring the amateur detective Joseph Rouletabille (1908) -- and the immensely popular The Phantom of the Opera (1910). Maurice Leblanc also rose to prominence with the adventures of gentleman-thief Arsene Lupin, who has gained a popularity akin to Sherlock Holmes in the Anglophone world.

== From 1914 to 1945 ==
=== Dada and Surrealism ===
The First World War generated even more radical tendencies. The Dada movement—which began in a café in Switzerland in 1916—came to Paris in 1920, but by 1924 the writers around Paul Éluard, André Breton, Louis Aragon and Robert Desnos—heavily influenced by Sigmund Freud's notion of the unconscious—had modified dada provocation into Surrealism. In writing and in the visual arts, and by using automatic writing, creative games (like the cadavre exquis) and altered states (through alcohol and narcotics), the surrealists tried to reveal the workings of the unconscious mind. The group championed previous writers they saw as radical (Arthur Rimbaud, the Comte de Lautréamont, Baudelaire, Raymond Roussel) and promoted an anti-bourgeois philosophy (particularly with regards to sex and politics) which would later lead most of them to join the communist party. Other writers associated with surrealism include: Jean Cocteau, René Crevel, Jacques Prévert, Jules Supervielle, Benjamin Péret, Philippe Soupault, Pierre Reverdy, Antonin Artaud (who revolutionized theater), Henri Michaux and René Char. The surrealist movement would continue to be a major force in experimental writing and the international art world until the Second World War. The surrealists technique was particularly well suited for poetry and theater, although Breton, Aragon and Cocteau wrote longer prose works as well, such as Breton's novel Nadja.

=== Influence and dissidence ===
The influence of surrealism will be of great importance on poets like Saint-John Perse or Edmond Jabès, for example. Others, such as Georges Bataille, created their own movement and group in reaction. The Swiss writer Blaise Cendrars was close to Apollinaire, Pierre Reverdy, Max Jacob and the artists Chagall and Léger, and his work has similarities with both surrealism and cubism.

=== Novel ===
In the first half of the century the genre of the novel also went through further changes. Louis-Ferdinand Céline's novels—such as Voyage au bout de la nuit (Journey to the End of Night) -- used an elliptical, oral, and slang-derived style to rail against the hypocrisies and moral lapses of his generation (his anti-semitic tracts in the 1940s, however, led to his condemnation for collaboration). Georges Bernanos's novels used other formal techniques (like the "journal form") to further psychological exploration. Psychological analysis was also central to François Mauriac's novels, although he would come to be seen by Sartre as representative of an outdated fatalism. Jules Romains's 27-volume novel Les Hommes de bonne volonté (1932–1946), Roger Martin du Gard's eight-part novel cycle The Thibaults (1922–1940), and Marcel Proust's seven-part masterpiece À la recherche du temps perdu (In Search of Lost Time, 1913–1927) expanded on the roman-fleuve model. André Gide continued to experiment with the novel, and his most sophisticated exploration of the limits of the traditional novel is found in The Counterfeiters, a novel ostensibly about a writer trying to write a novel.

=== Theater ===
Theater in the 1920s and 1930s went through further changes in a loose association of theaters (called the "Cartel") around the directors and producers Louis Jouvet, Charles Dullin, Gaston Baty and Ludmila and Georges Pitoëff. They produced works by the French writers Jean Giraudoux, Jules Romains, Jean Anouilh, Albert Camus and Jean-Paul Sartre, and also of Greek and Shakespearean theater, and works by Luigi Pirandello, Anton Chekhov and George Bernard Shaw. Antonin Artaud 1896-1948 as a poet and playwright revolutions the concept of language, and changes the history and practice of theater.

=== Existentialism ===
In the late 1930s, the works of Hemingway, Faulkner and Dos Passos came to be translated into French, and their prose style had a profound impact on the work of writers like Jean-Paul Sartre, André Malraux and Albert Camus. Sartre, Camus, Malraux and Simone de Beauvoir (who is also famous as one of the forerunners of Feminist writing) are often called "existentialist writers", a reference to Sartre's philosophy of Existentialism (although Camus refused the title "existentialist"). Sartre's theater, novels and short stories often show individuals forced to confront their freedom or doomed for their refusal to act. Malraux's novels of Spain and China during the civil wars confront individual action with historical forces. Similar issues appear in the novels of Henri Troyat.

=== In the French colonies ===
The 1930s and 1940s saw significant contributions by citizens of French colonies, as Albert Camus or Aimé Césaire, the latter whom created, along with Léopold Sédar Senghor and Léon Damas the literary review L'Étudiant Noir, which was a forerunner of the Négritude movement.

== Literature after World War II ==
The 1950s and 1960s were highly turbulent times in France: despite a dynamic economy ("les trente glorieuses" or "30 Glorious Years"), the country was torn by their colonial heritage (Vietnam and Indochina, Algeria), by their collective sense of guilt from the Vichy Regime, by their desire for renewed national prestige (Gaullism), and by conservative social tendencies in education and industry. The works, positions and thinking of Albert Camus are also emblematic of a reckoning in the French intellectual circles of post World War II, signaling the moral imperative to distance from Communism.

Inspired by the theatrical experiments in the early half of the century and by the horrors of the war, the so-called avant-garde Parisian theater, "New Theater" or "Theatre of the Absurd" around the writers Eugène Ionesco, Samuel Beckett, Jean Genet, Arthur Adamov, Fernando Arrabal refused simple explanations and abandoned traditional characters, plots and staging. Other experiments in theatre involved decentralisation, regional theater, "popular theater" (designed to bring working classes to the theater), and theater heavily influenced by Bertolt Brecht (largely unknown in France before 1954), and the productions of Arthur Adamov and Roger Planchon. The Avignon festival was started in 1947 by Jean Vilar who was also important in the creation of the T.N.P. or "Théâtre National Populaire."

The French novel from the 1950s on went through a similar experimentation in the group of writers published by "Les Éditions de Minuit", a French publisher; this "Nouveau roman" ("new novel"), associated with Alain Robbe-Grillet, Marguerite Duras, Robert Pinget, Michel Butor, Samuel Beckett, Nathalie Sarraute, Claude Simon, also abandoned traditional plot, voice, characters and psychology. To a certain degree, these developments closely paralleled changes in cinema in the same period (the Nouvelle Vague).Furthermore, French writing's about the course of the recent world war were plentiful, with many works, such as Au Revoir Les Enfants by Louis Malle becomg widespread and popular

The writers Georges Perec, Raymond Queneau, Jacques Roubaud are associated with the creative movement Oulipo (founded in 1960) which uses elaborate mathematical strategies and constraints (such as lipograms and palindromes) as a means of triggering ideas and inspiration.

Poetry in the post-war period followed a number of interlinked paths, most notably deriving from surrealism (such as with the early work of René Char), or from philosophical and phenomenological concerns stemming from Heidegger, Friedrich Hölderlin, existentialism, the relationship between poetry and the visual arts, and Stéphane Mallarmé's notions of the limits of language. Another important influence was the German poet Paul Celan. Poets working within these philosophical/language concerns—especially concentrated around the review "L'Ephémère"—include Yves Bonnefoy, André du Bouchet, Jacques Dupin, Claude Esteban, Roger Giroux and Philippe Jaccottet. Many of these ideas were also key to the works of Maurice Blanchot. The unique poetry of Francis Ponge exerted a strong influence on a variety of writers (both phenomenologists and those from the group "Tel Quel"). The later poets Claude Royet-Journoud, Anne-Marie Albiach, Emmanuel Hocquard, and to a degree Jean Daive, describe a shift from Heidegger to Ludwig Wittgenstein and a reevaluation of Mallarmé's notion of fiction and theatricality; these poets were also influenced by certain English-language modern poets (such as Ezra Pound, Louis Zukofsky, William Carlos Williams, and George Oppen) along with certain American postmodern and avant garde poets loosely grouped around the language poetry movement (such as Michael Palmer, Keith Waldrop and Susan Howe; with her husband Keith Waldrop, Rosmarie Waldrop has a profound association with these poets, due in no small measure to her translations of Edmond Jabès and the prose of Paul Celan into English).

The events of May 1968 marked a watershed in the development of a radical ideology of revolutionary change in education, class, family and literature. In theater, the conception of "création collective" developed by Ariane Mnouchkine's Théâtre du Soleil refused division into writers, actors and producers: the goal was for total collaboration, for multiple points of view, for an elimination of separation between actors and the public, and for the audience to seek out their own truth.

The most important review of the post-1968 period -- Tel Quel—is associated with the writers Philippe Sollers, Julia Kristeva, Georges Bataille, the poets Marcelin Pleynet and Denis Roche, the critics Roland Barthes, Gérard Genette and the philosophers Jacques Derrida, Jacques Lacan.

Another post-1968 change was the birth of "Écriture féminine" promoted by the feminist Editions des Femmes, with new women writers as Chantal Chawaf, Hélène Cixous, Luce Irigaray ...

From the 1960s on, many of the most daring experiments in French literature have come from writers born in French overseas departments or former colonies. This Francophone literature includes the prize-winning novels of Tahar ben Jelloun (Morocco), Patrick Chamoiseau (Martinique), Amin Maalouf (Lebanon) and Assia Djebar (Algeria).

== See also ==
- France in Modern Times II (1920–today)
- Prix Goncourt - a French literary award for prose fiction, first awarded in 1903
- Prix Femina - literary award since 1904
- Prix Apollinaire - a French literary award for poetry, first awarded in 1941
- Prix Médicis - literary award since 1958
- Hussards (literary movement)
- La Becquée
