= Jean-Pascal Chaigne =

French composer

Jean-Pascal Chaigne (born 1977) is a French composer.

Following initial studies at the Conservatoire National de Région de Tours and the University of Tours, he was admitted to the Conservatoire de Paris where he obtained first prizes in analysis, harmony, orchestration, counterpoint, 20th century music writing and composition, studying with Emmanuel Nunes and Stefano Gervasoni. Jean-Pascal Chaigne is Professor of XX-XXI century musical writing at the Paris Conservatory (CNSMDP) and at the Haute Ecole de Musique Vaud Valais Fribourg (Lausanne Conservatory) in Switzerland.

== Works ==
=== Solo instrument ===
- De miroir, d'absence (2016) for viola da gamba
- L'énigme et son sommeil (2011, after Kardia by Claude Royet-Journoud) for soprano
- L'épaisseur d'un cri (2012) for traverso (baroque flute)
- Hymne I (2010) for flute
- Hymne II (2013) for percussion
- Objets I (2007) for bass clarinet
- Soit donc cela I (2013) for harpsichord
- Soit donc cela II (2013) for organ
- Trace (2014) for double bass
- Vertical et blanc I (2006-revised 2009) for cello
- Vertical et blanc II (2009) for viola
- Vertical et blanc III (2009-revised 2011) for violin
- Wie ein Toter (2013) for cello

=== Chamber ensemble ===
- ...an die Nacht I (2013) for solo flute, string trio, piano and percussion
- Aux limites sourdes (2015) for solo violin, percussion and three female voices
- Césure : le corps (2010, after a poem by Anne-Marie Albiach) for mezzo-soprano and violin
- Dans la ligne des paupières (2013, after a poem by Anne-Marie Albiach) for soprano and string quartet
- De sa disparition (2013) for female voice, Celtic harp and cello
- Dire I (2013) for two pianos
- Dire II (2014) for clarinet, percussion, piano, violin, viola and cello
- L'élaboration du silence (2012, after a poem by Anne-Marie Albiach) for three female voices or female chorus
- Entaille for string quartet (2015)
- Hymne III (in progress) for piano and percussion
- Hymne V (2018) for piccolo and xylophone
- Hymne VI (2010) for flute, piano and percussion
- Immer wieder Angst (2016, after Kafka) for soprano, flute, clarinet, violin, cello and piano
- Objets II (2008) for cello octet
- Objets III - L'amant et l'image (2012, after a poem by Claude Royet-Journoud) for mezzo-soprano, flute, guitar, percussion and violin
- Objets IV (2011) for saxophone quartet
- Reflet for clarinet, violin and cello (2014)
- Répétition (2004- revised 2010, after a poem by Anne-Marie Albiach) for mezzo-soprano, string trio and harpsichord
- Strates (2010, after a poem by Anne-Marie Albiach) for mezzo-soprano, viola, cello and harpsichord
- Trois mouvements for string quartet (2009)
- La voix extrême la lumière (2010, after a poem by Anne-Marie Albiach) for mezzo-soprano, cello and harpsichord

=== Orchestra / Vocal ensemble ===
- ...an die Nacht II (2013, after a poem by Novalis) for solo percussionist, four percussionists and mixed choir
- Der Bau (2011), monodrama for narrator, vocal sextet and orchestra, from the Franz Kafka's novella Der Bau
- L'élaboration du silence (2012, after a poem by Anne-Marie Albiach) for three female voices or female choir
- Figurations (2009) for string trio and chamber orchestra
- Figuration I (2007) for cello and chamber orchestra
- Figuration III / La trajectoire du souffle (2011) for violin and large orchestra
- Ma voix te suit (2011, after Kardia by Claude Royet-Journoud) for a cappella choir (SATB)
- Shlof (2015) for vocal sextet, after a Yiddish lullaby; excerpt from the monodrama Der Bau
- Ludwig van Beethoven Sonate 15 opus 28 n°1 (2003) [orchestration] for orchestra
- Arnold Schönberg Three pieces opus 11 n°1 (2004) [orchestration] for large orchestra
- Arnold Schönberg Three pieces opus 11 n°2 (2005) [orchestration] for large orchestra

=== Cycles ===
- Triptych after Kafka
  - Der Bau for narrator, vocal sextet and chamber orchestra
  - Immer wieder Angst for soprano, flute, clarinet, violin, cello and piano
  - Wie ein Toter for cello
- Le travail du silence cycle (after Roger Giroux):
  - L’épaisseur d’un cri, for traverso (baroque flute)
  - Soit donc cela I, for harpsichord
  - Soit donc cela II, for organ
  - De miroir, d’absence, for viola da gamba
  - Cet abîme d’étoiles, for theorbo [en cours d’écriture]
- Objets cycle
  - Objets I for bass clarinet
  - Objets II for cello octet
  - Objets III for mezzo-soprano, flute, guitar, percussion and violin
  - Objets IV for saxophone quartet
- Mezza Voce cycle, after Mezza Voce by Anne-Marie Albiach
  - Césure : le corps for mezzo-soprano and violin
  - Vertical et blanc I for cello
  - La voix extrême la lumière for mezzo-soprano, cello and harpsichord
  - Vertical et blanc II for viola
  - Strates for mezzo-soprano, viola, cello and harpsichord
  - Vertical et blanc III for violin
  - Répétition for mezzo-soprano, string trio and harpsichord
- Kardia diptych, after Kardia by Claude Royet-Journoud
  - L'énigme et son sommeil for soprano
  - Ma voix te suit for a cappella choir (SATB)
- Hymnes à la nuit cycle, after Hymnen an die Nacht by Novalis
  - Hymne I for flute
  - Hymne II for percussion
  - Hymne III for piano and percussion
  - Hymne IV for piano
  - Hymne V for flute and percussion
  - Hymne VI for flute, piano and percussion
- Les chiffres du corps triptych
  - Trace for double bass
  - Reflet for clarinet, violin and cello
  - Entaille for string quartet

== Awards ==
- Francis and Mica Salabert Foundation Prize (2009)
- Second Prize of the Mottini Competition 2012 for young composers
- Selected in the Ensemble Aleph’s 7th International Forum in 2014 for his composition Dire II.

== Discography ==
- « Dédicaces » (2010): Jean-Marc Fessard, bass clarinet (Quantum – Codaex); Objets I for bass clarinet is recorded on this CD
