= Norma Cole =

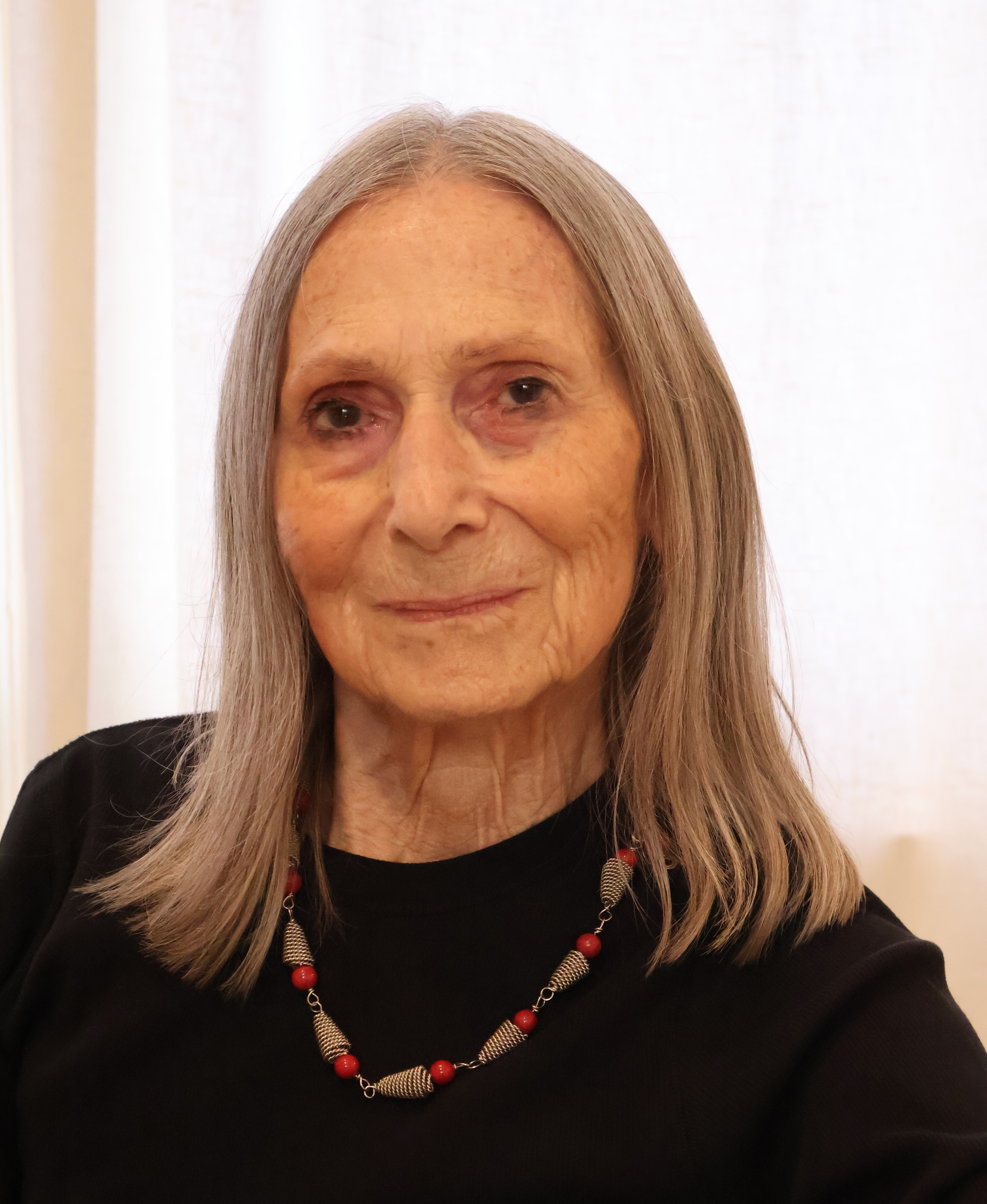
- Norma Cole, San Francisco, 2026
- Born: May 12, 1945 (age 81); Toronto, Canada
- Education: University of Toronto
- Occupations: Poet, visual artist, translator, curator
- Writing career
- Period: Late 20th century – present
- Genres: Poetry, translation, visual art
- Notable works: Alibi Lullaby, "Where Shadows Will", Spinoza in Her Youth, Collective Memory
- Notable awards: Gerbode Poetry Prize, Foundation for Contemporary Arts Grants to Artists Award, Robert D. Richardson Non-Fiction Award
- Website: normacole.org

Norma Cole (born May 12, 1945) is a poet, visual artist, translator, and curator. An Anglophone Canadian by birth, Cole is the author of thirteen collections of poetry, numerous chapbooks, and a volume of critical essays. She has worked extensively with community organizing through poetry in the San Francisco Bay Area and has taught in a number of institutions of higher education in the region. She has also translated nine volumes of poetry and critical work by French-language poets, including Emmanuel Hocquard, Danielle Collobert, Fouad Gabriel Naffah, and Jean Daive. Cole moved to San Francisco in 1977 and joined the community of poets congregating around Robert Duncan and the New College of California. Her papers are collected at the Archive for New Poetry at the Mandeville Special Collections Library, University of California San Diego and at the Poetry Collection at Buffalo Libraries Special Collection.

== Life & career ==
Born in Toronto, Canada to an Anglophone family, Norma Cole began writing poetry at a young age. She received a B.A. in Modern Languages and Literature (French and Italian) from the University of Toronto in 1967 and an M.A. in French Language and Literature in 1969.

Cole then moved to France and lived for several years in a small village of artists and artisans in the foothills of the Alpes-Maritimes near Nice, where she immersed herself in writing and visual art.

In the early 1970s, Cole returned to Toronto and then moved to San Francisco in 1977, where she has lived since, while still maintaining a close relationship to France. Cole quickly became engaged with the lively poetry community in San Francisco, particularly the community connected with the New College of California, including Robert Duncan, Michael Palmer, David Levi Strauss, Susan Thackrey, Aaron Shurin, and Laura Moriarty.

=== Poetry, Teaching & Awards ===
Over the ensuing years, Norma Cole has published thirteen books of poetry with publishers such as Omnidawn and City Lights, and has published nine book-length translations, as well as a book of essays. She has taught at a number of colleges, universities, and art schools. She served as the Regents' Lecturer at the University of California, Berkeley in 2008 and taught at San Francisco State University, the University of San Francisco, Saint Mary's College of California, and Otis School of Art and Design, among others.

Norma Cole is the recipient of the Gerbode Poetry Prize and grants from the Fund for Poetry. In 2006, she received a "Grants to Artists Award" from the Foundation for Contemporary Arts Grants to Artists Award. "The Poetics of Vertigo" — delivered as the 1998 "George Oppen Memorial Lecture" for The Poetry Center, SFSU — won the Robert D. Richardson Non-Fiction Award. With Boston photographer Ben E. Watkins, she won the Purchase Award for their photo/text collaboration, "They Flatter Almost Recognize."

=== Visual Arts ===
Norma Cole’s visual art covers various media, including oil pastel, oil paint, watercolor, graphite, and charcoal, as well as collage, installation, and video. Her two-dimensional work has been shown at the New College of California, the Berkeley Art Museum, the Miami University Art Museum, 2nd Floor Projects, and Right Window in San Francisco. Her 2019 video, By the Turning Bridge, documents the street life of an intersection along the Canal Saint-Martin in Paris.

Her visual work and collaborations have appeared in a number of journals including Zyzzyva, How(ever), and ACTS. Duration Press, founded and run by Jerrold Shiroma, has archived many elements of Cole’s work in their "Gallery" section, including much of her visual work and her multi-media piece, Scout.

=== Collaborations ===
Norma Cole's work has been noted for its "openness to traditions and practices, artists and writings, radically divergent from her own". And throughout her career, she has been recognized “as a connector of diverse communities through multiple pathways and associations.”

In collaboration with the San Francisco State Poetry Center, she created a three-part installation, Collective Memory, which was shown at The California Historical Society from Dec. 2004-April 2005 as part of the exhibition Poetry and its Arts: Bay Area Interactions 1954–2004. She also collaborated with San Francisco’s Poets’ Theater throughout the 80s, 90s, and 00s, and wrote two of their plays with the director, Kevin Killian. And she has collaborated with a number of other visual artists, including Marina Adams, Amy Trachtenberg, and Jess (Collins).

She is also a curator; she organized and presented a show of Marina Adams’ work at the Cue Arts Foundation in NYC, and has served as a curatorial member of the Right Window Collective in San Francisco for the past several years.

=== A Volume of Critical Essays on Her Work ===
In 2025, literary critic and professor Dale M. Smith edited That Tongue Be Time, a collection of essays on Cole’s work by writers, translators, and critics, including Vincent Katz, David Levi Strauss, Laura Moriarty, Martin Corless-Smith, Roberto Tejada, and Garrett Caples. The essays cover all aspects of her work, touching on her poetics, her visual art, her community involvements, and her translations as well as presenting in-depth discussions of her extensive body of poetry. It was published by the University of New Mexico Press.

== Selected works ==
=== Poetry: Books ===
- Metamorphopsia (Poets & Poets, 1988) ISBN 978-0-937013-23-6.
- My Bird Book (Littoral, 1991). ISBN 978-1-55713-090-7
- Mars (Listening Chamber, Berkeley, California 1994). ISBN 978-0-9639321-1-2
- Moira (O Books, 1995). ISBN 978-1-882022-28-1
- Contrafact (Poets & Poets, 1996). ISBN 978-0-937013-54-0
- Spinoza in Her Youth (Omnidawn Publishing, Richmond, CA, 2002) ISBN 1-890650-09-9.
- Do the Monkey (Zasterle, 2006) ISBN 84-87467-44-X.
- Natural Light (Libellum, 2009) ISBN 978-0-9752993-6-4
- Where Shadows Will: Selected Poems 1988-2008 (City Lights Books, San Francisco, 2009) ISBN 978-0-87286-474-0.
- Win These Posters and Other Unrelated Prizes Inside. (Omnidawn Publishing, Richmond, CA, 2010) ISBN 978-1-89065-068-1
- Actualities (collaboration with painter Marina Adams) (New York: Litmus Press, 2015) ISBN 978-1-933959-28-3
- FATE NEWS (Richmond, CA: Omnidawn, 2018) ISBN 978-1-63243-058-8
- Alibi Lullaby (Omnidawn Publishing, Richmond CA, 2025) ISBN 978-1-63243-162-2
- Mars (City Lights Books, San Francisco, California 2026).

=== Poetry: Chapbooks ===
- Mace Hill Remap (Paris: Moving Letters, 1988). [ e-text version available: see External links below ]
- Quotable Gestures, (CREAPHIS/un bureau sur l'Atlantique, France, 1998)
- Desire & its Double (Instress, 1998).
- The Vulgar Tongue (a+bend, 2000).
- A little a & a (Seeing Eye Books, Los Angeles, 2002).
- Burns (Belladonna Books, 2002).
- 14000 Facts (A+Bend Press, 2009)

=== Literary Criticism ===
- To Be At Music: Essays & Talks (Omnidawn Publishing, Richmond, CA, 2010) ISBN 978-1-890650-44-5

=== Text and image ===
- Scout, text/image work in CD ROM format, (Krupskaya, 2004).
- At All: Tom Raworth & His Collages (Hooke Press, 2006).
- Collective Memory (Granary Books, 2006), poetry/photos, with book design by Emily McVarish; based on Cole's extended installation/performance for the exhibition "Poetry and its Arts: Bay Area Interactions 1954-2004" (California Historical Society, San Francisco, CA, 2004–05).

=== Translations ===
- It Then by Danielle Collobert (O Books, 1989) ISBN 978-1-882022-02-1.
- The Surrealists Look at Art, essays by Aragon, Breton, Eluard, Soupault, Tzara, edited and translated with Michael Palmer, (Lapis Press, Venice, California, 1990).
- This Story is Mine: Little Autobiographical Dictionary of Elegy by Emmanuel Hocquard, (Instress, 1999).
- A Discursive Space: Interviews with Jean Daive by Anne-Marie Albiach, (Duration Press, Sausalito, California, 1999.
- (editor and translator) Crosscut Universe, an anthology of poetry / poetics by contemporary French writers, (Burning Deck, 2000) ISBN 978-1-886224-39-1.
- Nude by Anne Portugal [Le Plus simple appareil], (Kelsey Street Press, Berkeley, California, 2001) ISBN 978-0-932716-57-6
- Distant Noise by Jean Frémon, (with Lydia Davis, Serge Gavronsky, Cole Swensen), (Avec Books, Penngrove, California, 2003) ISBN 978-1-880713-31-0.
- Notebooks 1956-1978 by Danielle Collobert, (Litmus Press, 2003) ISBN 0-9723331-1-8
- Mind-God and the Properties of Nitrogen by Fouad Gabriel Naffah (Post-Apollo Press, Sausalito, California, 2004). ISBN 978-0-942996-53-1
- Paul Celan: les jours et les nuits by Jean Daive (Duration Press, 2020).
