= Turmoil in the Swaths =

1966 novel by Boris Vian

- First edition
- Author: Boris Vian
- Original title: Trouble dans les andains
- Language: French
- Publisher: La Jeune Parque
- Publication date: 1966
- Publication place: France
- Pages: 159

Turmoil in the Swaths (French: Trouble dans les andains) is a mystery novel by the French writer Boris Vian. It was published posthumously by La Jeune Parque in 1966.

== See also ==
- 1966 in literature
- 20th-century French literature
