= Anthony Barnett (poet) =

English poet, essayist and music historian

- Born: Anthony Peter John Barnett; London, England
- Occupation: Poet, essayist, publisher, music historian

Anthony Barnett is an English poet, essayist and music historian.

== Literary works ==
Barnett's volumes of poetry and short prose include collected Poems &, collected Translations, Translations Addenda, Lithos, The Making of a Story, Like Those of an Eerie Ruin, Book Paradise: Spillikins (with drawings by Lucy Rose Cunningham). Antonyms Anew: Barbs & Loves is a collection of critical essays. He was the publisher of the first edition of J. H. Prynne’s collected Poems (1982), and edited Veronica Forrest-Thomson's Collected Poems and Translations (1990) and Collected Poems (2008). Barnett's work is represented in the anthologies A Various Art; Poets on Writing: Britain, 1970–1991; Other: British and Irish Poetry since 1970; Cambridge University Press Contexts in Literature Contemporary Poetry: Poets and Poetry Since 1990. His translations include Ryūnosuke Akutagawa, Anne-Marie Albiach, Roger Giroux, Pär Lagerkvist, Tarjei Vesaas, Andrea Zanzotto. Separate books of translation include Osip Mandelstam, Whoever Has Found a Horseshoe, with drawings by Lucy Rose Cunningham (2023), and Elsa Morante, Alibi, with paintings and drawings by Monica Ferrando (2024). In 2002 he was visiting scholar at the Center for International Programs, Meiji University, Tokyo. The lecture he gave there is published as InExperience and UnCommon Sense in Translation. He co-edits and publishes the literary, music and arts journal Snow lit rev (from 2013). His one-act play The Literature Director, lampooning the British Council and the English Arts Council, written in 2012, was posted online in 2023 at Fortnightly Review.

== Music works ==
He has worked as a percussionist, notably with John Tchicai. Barnett has written extensively on African-American violinists, in particular Stuff Smith: Desert Sands, Eddie South: Black Gypsy, Juice Wilson: Fallen from the Moon: Robert Edward Juice Wilson: His Life on Earth: A Dossier. He produces CDs on his AB Fable Violin Improvisation Studies label, and for other labels. He is the author of Listening for Henry Crowder: A Monograph on His Almost Lost Music (Allardyce Book, 2007), about the pianist consort of Nancy Cunard. UnNatural Music: John Lennon & Yoko Ono in Cambridge 1969 is his account of the circumstances surrounding their appearance at the Natural Music concert, which he produced.
