= Rosmarie Waldrop =

American poet, translator and professor

- Born: Rosmarie Sebald; August 24, 1935 (age 91); Kitzingen, Germany
- Education: University of Michigan
- Occupations: poet, professor, translator
- Spouse: Keith Waldrop (m. 1959; died 2023)
- Writing career
- Notable awards: Chevalier des arts et des lettres

Rosmarie Waldrop (born Rosmarie Sebald; August 24, 1935) is an American poet, novelist, translator, essayist, and publisher. Born in Germany, she has lived in the United States since 1958 and in Providence, Rhode Island since the late 1960s. Waldrop is a co-editor and publisher of Burning Deck Press.

== Early life in Germany ==
Waldrop was born in Kitzingen am Main on August 24, 1935. Her father, Joseph Sebald, taught physical education at the town's high school. Toward the end of World War II, she joined a traveling theatre, but she returned to school in 1946. At school, she studied piano and flute and played in a youth orchestra. During Christmas 1954, the orchestra gave a concert for American soldiers stationed at Kitzingen. After the performance, Keith Waldrop, a member of the audience, invited members of the orchestra to listen to his records. He and Rosmarie became friendly and worked together over the next few months, translating German poetry into English.

== University years ==
That same year, she entered the University of Würzburg, where she studied literature, art history and musicology. In 1955, she transferred to the University of Freiburg, where she discovered the writings of Robert Musil and participated in a protest against a lecture given by Heidegger. She then moved to the University of Aix-Marseille, where Keith spent 1956–57 on his GI Bill. At the end of the year, he returned to the University of Michigan. In 1958, he won a Major Hopwood Prize, sending most of the money to Rosmarie to pay for her passage to the United States.

== In the United States ==
The couple married and Rosmarie enrolled at the University of Michigan, where she received a Ph.D. in 1966. She also became active in literary, musical, and artistic circles around the university and the wider Ann Arbor community. She began serious translation of French and German poetry. In 1961, the Waldrops bought a secondhand printing press and started Burning Deck Magazine. This was the beginning of Burning Deck, which became one of the most influential small press publishers of innovative poetry in the United States. Burning Deck published writers such as Mei-mei Berssenbrugge, William Bronk, Robert Coover, Forrest Gander, Michael Gizzi, Peter Gizzi, Barbara Guest, Lyn Hejinian, X. J. Kennedy, Jackson MacLow, Harry Matthews, Pam Rehm, and W. D. Snodgrass.

== Poetry and translations ==
Rosmarie Waldrop started publishing her own poetry in English in the late 1960s. Since then, she has published over three dozen books of poetry, prose and translation. Her work is variously characterized as verse experiment, philosophical statement, and personal narrative. Of the many formative influences on her style, a crucial one was a year spent in Paris in the early 1970s, when she came into contact with leading avant garde French poets, including Claude Royet-Journoud, Anne-Marie Albiach, and Edmond Jabès. These writers influenced her work, and she and Keith became some of the main translators of their work into English, with Burning Deck one of the main vehicles for introducing their work to an English-language readership.

== Awards and honors ==
Rosmarie Waldrop has given readings and published in many parts of Europe and the United States. She has received numerous awards and fellowships and was made a Chevalier des Arts et des Lettres by the French government. In 2003 she received a Foundation for Contemporary Arts' Grants to Artists Award. She was elected to the American Academy of Arts and Sciences in 2006. She received the 2008 PEN Award for Poetry in Translation for her translation of Ulf Stolterfoht's book Lingos I - IX. Her translation of Almost 1 Book / Almost 1 Life by Elfriede Czurda was nominated for the Best Translated Book Award in 2013. She was given the America Award in Literature for her lifetime contribution to international writing in 2021.

== Selected publications ==
=== Poetry ===
- The Aggressive Ways of the Casual Stranger, NY: Random House, 1972
- The Road Is Everywhere or Stop This Body, Columbia, MO: Open Places, 1978
- When They Have Senses, Providence: Burning Deck, 1980
- Nothing Has Changed, Windsor, VT: Awede Press, 1981
- Differences for Four Hands, Philadelphia: Singing Horse, 1984; repr. Providence: Paradigm Press, 1999
- Streets Enough to Welcome Snow, Barrytown, NY: Station Hill, 1986
- The Reproduction of Profiles, NY: New Directions, 1987
- Shorter American Memory, Providence: Paradigm Press, 1988
- Peculiar Motions, Berkeley, CA: Kelsey Street Press, 1990
- Lawn of Excluded Middle, NY: Tender Buttons, 1993
- A Key Into the Language of America, NY: New Directions, 1994
- Another Language: Selected Poems, Jersey City: Talisman House, 1997
- Split Infinites, Philadelphia: Singing Horse Press, 1998
- Reluctant Gravities, NY: New Directions, 1999
- (with Keith Waldrop) Well Well Reality, Sausalito, CA: The Post-Apollo Press, 1998
- Love, Like Pronouns, Omnidawn Publishing, 2003
- Blindsight, New York: New Directions, 2004
- Splitting Image, Zasterle, 2006
- Curves to the Apple, New Directions, 2006
- Driven to Abstraction, New Directions, 2010
- Gap Gardening: Selected Poems, New Directions, 2016
- The Nick of Time, New Directions, 2021

=== Fiction ===
- The Hanky of Pippin's Daughter, Barrytown, NY: Station Hill, 1986
- A Form/of Taking/It All, Barrytown, NY: Station Hill, 1990

=== Essays and criticism ===
- Against Language?, The Hague: Mouton/Berlin: Walter de Gruyter, 1971
- The Ground Is the Only Figure: Notebook Spring 1996, Providence: The Impercipient Lecture Series, Vol. 1, No. 3 (April 1997)
- Lavish Absence: Recalling and Rereading Edmond Jabès, Wesleyan University Press, 2002
- Dissonance (if you are interested), University Alabama Press, 2005

=== Translations ===
- The Book of Questions by Edmond Jabès, 7 vols. bound as 4, Wesleyan UP, 1976, 1977, 1983, 1984
- From a Reader's Notebook, by Alain Veinstein, Annex Press, Ithaca New York, 1983
- Paul Celan: Collected Prose, by Paul Celan, Manchester & NY: Carcanet & Sheep Meadow, 1986
- The Book of Dialogue by Edmond Jabès, Wesleyan UP, 1987
- Late Additions: Poems by Emmanuel Hocquard (with Connell McGrath), Peterborough, Cambs.: Spectacular Diseases, 1988
- The Book of Shares by Edmond Jabès, Chicago UP, 1989
- Some Thing Black by Jacques Roubaud, Elmwood Park, IL: Dalkey Archive, 1990
- The Book of Resemblances by Edmond Jabès, 3 vols., Wesleyan UP, 1990, 91, 92
- From the Book to the Book by Edmond Jabès, Wesleyan UP, 1991
- The Book of Margins by Edmond Jabès, Chicago UP, 1993
- A Foreigner Carrying in the Crook of His Arm a Tiny Book by Edmond Jabès, Wesleyan UP, 1993
- Heiligenanstalt by Friederike Mayröcker, Providence: Burning Deck, 1994
- The Plurality of Worlds of Lewis by Jacques Roubaud, Normal, IL: Dalkey Archive Press, 1995
- Mountains in Berlin: Selected Poems by Elke Erb, Providence: Burning Deck, 1995
- The Little Book of Unsuspected Subversion by Edmond Jabès, Stanford UP, 1996
- With Each Clouded Peak by Friederike Mayröcker (with Harriett Watts), Los Angeles, CA: Sun & Moon Press, 1998
- A Test of Solitude by Emmanuel Hocquard, Providence: Burning Deck, 2000
- (with Harry Mathews and Christopher Middleton) Many Glove Compartments by Oskar Pastior, Providence: Burning Deck, 2001
- Desire for a Beginning Dread of One Single End by Edmond Jabès (Images & Design by Ed Epping), New York, New York : Granary Books, 2001
- The Form of a City Changes Faster, Alas, Than the Human Heart by Jacques Roubaud, Dalkey Archive Press; Translation edition, 2006 ISBN 1-56478-383-9
- Almost 1 Book / Almost 1 Life by Elfriede Czurda, Providence, Burning Deck, 2012
- Under the Dome: Walks with Paul Celan by Jean Daive, San Francisco: City Lights Books, 2020
