= Elizabeth Willis =

American poet and literary critic (born 1961)

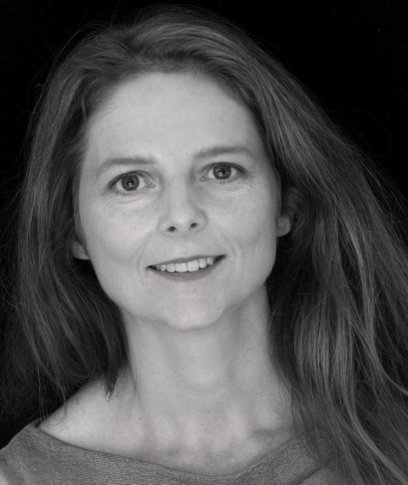
- Born: April 28, 1961 (age 65); Bahrain
- Education: University of Wisconsin, Eau Claire (BA); University at Buffalo (MA, PhD)
- Occupations: Poet, Professor, Literary Critic
- Writing career
- Notable works: Meteoric Flowers; Turneresque; The Human Abstract

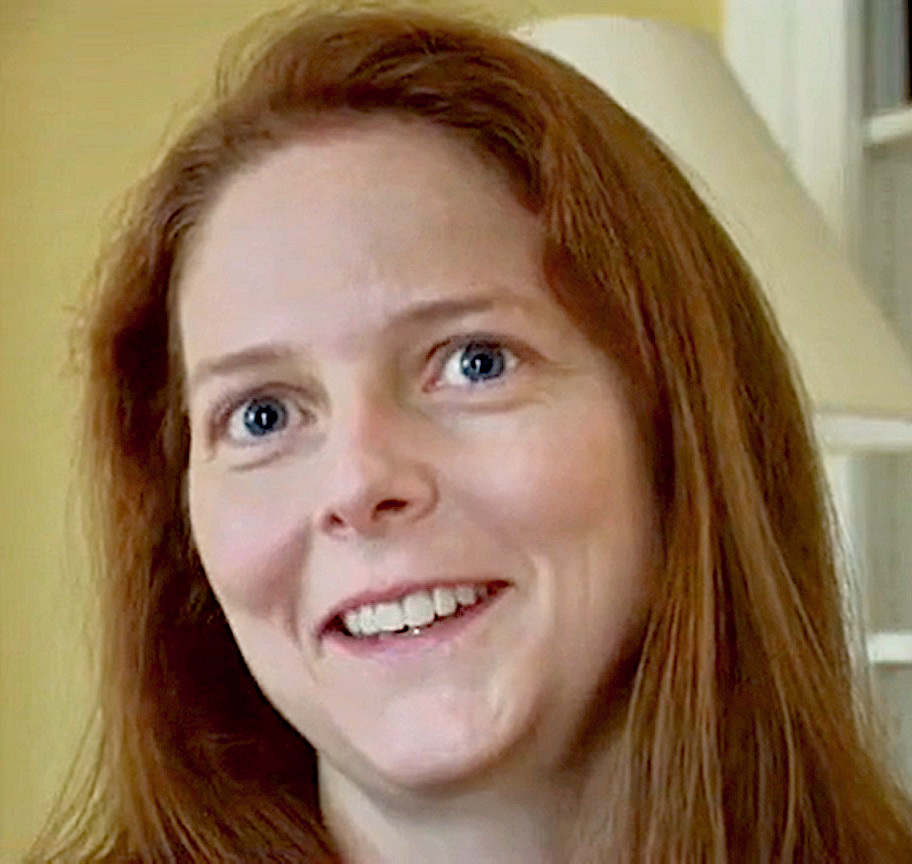
Elizabeth Willis in Speaking Portraits, c.2004

Elizabeth Willis (born April 28, 1961, Bahrain) is an American poet and literary critic. She currently serves as Professor of Poetry at the Iowa Writers' Workshop. Willis has won several awards for her poetry including the National Poetry Series and the Guggenheim Fellowship. Susan Howe has called Elizabeth Willis "an exceptional poet, one of the most outstanding of her generation."

== Life ==
Willis was born in Bahrain and grew up in the Midwestern United States. She received her undergraduate degree from the University of Wisconsin–Eau Claire then went on to earn a Ph.D. from the Poetics Program at University at Buffalo.

Willis has taught at several institutions including Brown University, Mills College, the University of Denver and Wesleyan University and has held residencies at the MacDowell Colony and the Centre International de Poésie, Marseille. Formerly the Shapiro-Silverberg professor of literature and creative writing at Wesleyan University, she currently serves as Professor of Poetry at the Iowa Writers' Workshop.

Willis has been awarded fellowships from the California Arts Council and the Howard Foundation and has won the National Poetry Series, the PEN New England Award and the Boston Review Prize for Poetry. In 2012, she was awarded the Guggenheim Fellowship. Willis lives in Iowa City.

== Work ==
As a poet, Willis employs the use of "hybrid genres," an attempt to "push the limits of representation." Turneresque, for instance, draws on elements as diverse as the Romantic sublime and film noir. In terms of style, Willis is most often recognized for her "intense lyricism." Her poetry tends to center on the relationship between art and nature and has been noted for its musicality and precision.

Her literary criticism is concerned with 19th century and 20th century poetry and the ways in which changing technology comes to influence the production of poetry. She also investigates the effects of public and private spaces in her prose. Additionally, Pre-Raphaelite aesthetics and the relationship between contemporary poets and antecedent poets are also frequent concerns of her work. Willis has dedicated a significant portion of her career to a study of the works of Lorine Niedecker.

== Reception ==
Elizabeth Willis's poetry has been widely praised. Jacket Magazine reported that Meteoric Flowers "offers the reader a strange and at times almost overwhelmingly pleasurable world." Poet Ron Silliman wrote that the collection "is filled with brief, well-balanced, brilliantly written prose poems." Susan Howe wrote, "Elizabeth Willis is an exceptional poet, one of the most outstanding of her generation, and Meteoric Flowers is her most compelling collection to date." Rosmarie Waldrop said that the collection "is a remarkable investigation of our experience and language."

In a review of Turneresque, the Denver Quarterly reported that Willis "succeeds...in reinvesting language with the uniqueness of origin: the breath gesture of each letter." Ann Lauterbach wrote that Willis "recovers the originating lyric impulse into a haunting contemporary song. This is poetry of amazing intelligence and grace." Cole Swensen wrote, "What drives Willis’s incisive commentary into stunning poetry are her gorgeous lines...Despite a distinctly noir atmosphere and the unsettling quality that always attends the sublime, Turneresque comes off as affirmative, even jocularly courageous. It seems - to borrow one of its phrases - "to imply or intone whole possibility of human sun."

Of Address, Jeffrey Cyphers Wright wrote that the collection was "humorous, political, engaged, and deeply resonant." Michael Palmer wrote that the book movingly engages "eternal issues." Alice Notley wrote that "Willis newly revives the list/litany form, and that works to the reader’s delight."

Reviewing Second Law, Susan Howe wrote, "The poems in Second Law are terse, precise, ecstatic and luminous. White letters serve as lures and traces through gaps of ordered scientific discourse, the rapture of the poet's will remains captive and rejoicing. In these linked fragmentary linguistic structures Elizabeth Willis enters Bunyan's emblematic river another time; singing."

Her 2024 collection, Liontaming in America, was longlisted for the National Book Award for Poetry.

== Awards ==
- 1994 National Poetry Series, for The Human Abstract
- Howard Foundation Fellowship
- PEN New England Award
- Residency at the MacDowell Colony
- 2012 Guggenheim Fellowship
- 2016 Pulitzer Prize for Poetry Finalist

== Bibliography ==
=== Poetry ===
Collections

- Second Law. Avenue B. 1992. ISBN 9780939691081.
- The Human Abstract. Penguin Books. 1995. ISBN 978-0-14-024935-4.
- Turneresque. Burning Deck. 2003. ISBN 9781886224629.
- Meteoric Flowers. Wesleyan University Press. 2006. ISBN 978-0-8195-6813-7.
- Address. Wesleyan University Press. 2012. ISBN 9780819573483.
- Alive: New and Selected Poems. New York Review Books. 2015. ISBN 9781590178645.
- Spectral Evidence. Litmus Press. 2023. ISBN 978-1-933959-55-9. (With Nancy Bowen)
- Liontaming In America. New Directions Books. 2024. ISBN 9780811238632.

List of poems

Title	Year	First published	Reprinted/collected
About the Author	2015	"About the author". The New Yorker. Vol. 90, no. 43. January 12, 2015. p. 30.	
Both Roads	2024	Liontaming in America. New Directions Books. 2024. p. 94. ISBN 978-0-8112-3863-2.	Harper's Magazine(October 2024 Issue)
The Perils of Pauline (1914)	2024	The New York Review (July 18, 2024 Issue)	
Future Imperfect	2023	e-flux Journal (Issue 136)	
Two Poems	2022	Harper's Magazine (April 2022 Issue)	
Two Poems		Company Editions	
In the Body, of a Book		Three Fold Press	
Plot	2016	The New Yorker (November 14, 2016 Issue)	
Cut Piece	2018	Chicago Review	
The Witch	2011	Boston Review	
Without Pity	1997	Conjunctions	
Valet of the Shadow of Death	2007	The Nation (November 26, 2007 Issue)	
Vernacular Architecture; Madame Cézanne as Sainte-Victoire; The Oldest Garden in the World; Nocturne; Bohemian Rhapsody	2007	Boston Review (November/December 2007 Issue)	

- "The Human Abstract", subtext
- "The Relation of the Lion to the Book is the Number 5 ", subtext
- "Envoi", subtext
- "Primeval Islands"; "Why No New Planets Are Ejected from the Sun"; "Oil and Water", No: a journal of the arts, No. 3

=== Criticism ===
- "Who Was Lorine Niedecker?" American Poet, Academy of American Poets, 2006
- Radical Vernacular: Lorine Niedecker and the Politics of Place. University of Iowa Press. 2006. ISBN 9781587296987.
