= Danielle Collobert =

French author, poet and journalist (1940–1978)

- Born: 23 July 1940; Rostrenen, Brittany, France
- Died: 23 July 1978 (aged 38); Paris, Île-de-France, France
- Occupations: Poet, novelist, and short story writer
- Writing career
- Period: 1961–1978
- Subjects: Death, madness, schizophrenia, gender
- Movements: Prose poetry, experimental poetry

Danielle Collobert (French pronunciation: [danjɛl kɔlɔbɛʁ]) (23 July 1940 – 23 July 1978) was a French author, poet and journalist.

== Biography ==
Danielle Collobert was born in Rostrenen, Côtes-d'Armor, on 23 July 1940.

Her mother, a teacher, was obliged to live in a neighbouring village, and Collobert thus grew up at her grandparents' house, where her mother and her aunt would return whenever they could. Both entered into the French Resistance.

In 1961, having abandoned her university studies, Collobert worked at the Galerie Hautefeuille in Paris, where she wrote "Totem" and many other texts that would three years later be part of her book Meurtre (Murder). In April of that year, she published, at her own expense, Chants des Guerres (War Songs) with publisher Pierre-Jean Oswald. Some years later, she destroyed the early editions of this, her first published book.

Collobert was active in the FLN and involved in missions in Algeria. After a self-imposed exile in Italy from May to August 1962, she returned to collaborate with the Algerian magazine Révolution Africaine until it stopped being published during the presidency of Ahmed Ben Bella. After rejection by Les Éditions de Minuit, her cause was supported by Raymond Queneau, which led to Gallimard publishing Meurtre in 1964.

After joining the Writers' Union in May 1968, and soon after turning up in Czechoslovakia during the Soviet backlash to the Prague Spring, Collobert traveled almost continuously from 1970 to 1976. Her travels strongly influenced her later writings. In 1978, she asked Uccio Esposito-Torrigiani to translate her last work, the ironically titled Survie (Survival), into Italian; reportedly, she wanted it published as quickly as possible. Survie came out at the end of April, and Collobert died by suicide on her birthday three months later, in a hotel on the rue Dauphine in Paris.

An experimental writer, Collobert wrote prose poems in a haunting, pessimistic, tense and stark style. Her work showed an obsession with death as the destination of humankind, the ambiguity of gender, travel and madness.

She died, by her own hand, in Paris on 23 July 1978.

== Bibliography ==
- Chants des guerres, Éditions P.-J. Oswald, 1961 (later by Éditions Calligrammes, Quimper, 1999).
- Meurtre, Gallimard (Lagny-sur-Marne, impr. É. Grevin et fils), [Paris,], 1964.
- Des nuits sur les hauteurs, Éditions Denoel (preface by Italo Calvino)
- Dire : I-II :+un-deux+, Paris, Seghers : Laffont, 1972, 27-Mesnil-sur-l'Estrée, impr. Firmin-Didot, 192 p., collection Change, série rouge.
- Il donc, Laffont, Paris, 1976.
- Survie, Éditions Orange Export Ltd., 1978.
- It Then, O Books, 1989 (trans. Norma Cole).
- Notebooks, 1956–1978, Litmus Press, 2003 (trans. Norma Cole)
- In the Environs of a Film, Litmus Press, 2019 (trans. Nathanaël)

Murder, translated from the French by Nathanaël (France; Litmus Press), was shortlisted for the 2014 Best Translated Book Award.
