= William Corbett (poet) =

American poet

William Corbett (October 11, 1942 – August 10, 2018) was an American poet, essayist, editor, educator, and publisher.

Corbett's work and public readings acknowledge the influence on him of jazz, modernist and imagist poetry (especially William Carlos Williams and Ezra Pound in his later work); the poets in Donald Allen's seminal anthology The New American Poetry 1945–1960, including those associated with Black Mountain College (most notably his friends Robert Creeley and John Wieners, and his mentor, Charles Olson), as well as New York School poets Frank O'Hara and James Schuyler and San Francisco poet Philip Whalen; classical Chinese poets (mainly Li Po); and French poetry of the mid-19th to early 20th centuries (especially Guillaume Apollinaire).

== Life and work ==
Corbett served as a teacher in the Expository Writing program at Harvard University and as writer-in-residence in the Program of Writing and Humanistic Studies at Massachusetts Institute of Technology (MIT), where he taught classes focusing on the craft of the personal essay and the creation of poetry. He edited for the small publisher Pressed Wafer, which specializes in poetry broadsides, chapbooks and books.

Corbett edited the letters of James Schuyler and published two memoirs: Philip Guston's Late Work: A Memoir (1994) and Furthering My Education (1997). He wrote frequently on art, and in 1999 published a book on the sculptor John Raimondi. Corbett had been a member of the CUE Art Foundation's Advisory Council since the Foundation opened its doors in 2003. He lived in Boston's South End for most of his adult life, but moved to Brooklyn, New York in his last decade. Corbett served as the poetry editor of Grand Street and frequently submitted work to local Boston newspapers, including the Boston Phoenix, for which he contributed book reviews. He also taught at New York University.

He was married and had two daughters.

== Selected publications ==
- Columbus Square Journal (Angel Hair Books, 1976) ISBN 0-935992-25-1
- Runaway Pond (Applewood Books, 1982) ISBN 0-918222-26-5
- Collected Poems (National Poetry Foundation, 1984) ISBN 0-915032-45-7
- On Blue Note (Zoland Books, 1989) ISBN 0-944072-06-2
- Don't Think: Look (Zoland Books, 1991)
- Literary New England: A History and Guide (Faber & Faber, 1993)
- Philip Guston's Late Work: A Memoir (Zoland Books, 1994)
- New & Selected Poems (Zoland Books, 1995)
- Furthering My Education (Zoland Books, 1997) ISBN 0-944072-74-7
- New York Literary Lights (Graywolf Press, 1998) ISBN 1-55597-272-1 (pbk.)
- Boston Vermont (Zoland Books, 1999)
- John Raimondi (Hudson Hills Press, 1999) ISBN 1-55595-179-1
- editor (with Michael Gizzi & Joseph Torra): The Blind See Only This World: Poems for John Wieners (Granary Books/Pressed Wafer, 2000) ISBN 1-887123-34-2
- All Prose: Selected Essays and Reviews (Zoland Books, 2001) ISBN 1-58195-102-7
- editor: Just The Thing: Selected Letters of James Schuyler 1951-1991 (Turtle Point Press, 2004) ISBN 1-885586-30-2
- editor: The Letters of James Schuyler to Frank O'Hara (Turtle Point Press, 2005) ISBN 978-1885586-48-3
- Opening Day (Hanging Loose Press, 2008) ISBN 978-1-931236-86-7
- Albert York (Pressed Wafer, 2010) ISBN 978-0-9824100-5-9
- The Whalen Poem (Hanging Loose Press, 2011) ISBN 978-1-934909-13-3
- Elegies for Michael Gizzi (Kat Ran Press, 2012) ISBN 978-0-9794342-3-5
