= Jean Daive =

French poet and translator

- Born: Jean de Schrynmakers; 13 May 1941 (age 85); Péruwelz, Belgium
- Occupations: poet, translator

Jean Daive (born 13 May 1941) is a French poet and translator. He is the author of novels, collections of poetry and has translated work by Paul Celan and Robert Creeley among others.

He has edited encyclopedias, worked as a radio journalist and producer with France Culture, and has edited three magazines: fragment (1970–73), fig. (1989–91), and FIN (1999–2006). His first book, Décimale blanche (Mercure de France, 1967) was translated into German by Paul Celan, and into English by Cid Corman.

== Life and work ==
Jean Daive was born in Bon-Secours, a section of the city of Péruwelz located in Wallonia, a predominantly French speaking southern region of Belgium and part of the province of Hainaut. Having been an encyclopedist for seventeen years, he worked on various radio programs for France Culture from 1975 until 2009.

Publishing since the 1960s and today known as one of the important French avant-garde poets, Daive's work is an investigation alternating between poetry, narration and reflective prose. He has published several interrelated volumes, including a sequence with the general title Narration d'équilibre (1982–90) and the prose series, La Condition d'infini (1995-97: 7 volumes, of which Under the Dome: Walks with Paul Celan, published in English in 2009, is volume 5).

According to Peter France, Daive's tense, elliptical poems explore the difficulties of existence in an enigmatic world.

Also a photographer, Daive chairs the Centre international de poésie de Marseille.

== Publications ==
In English

- White Decimal (tr. C. Corman), Origin, 1969
- A Lesson in Music (tr. Julie Kalendek), Providence, RI: Burning Deck, 1992
- Anne-Marie Albiach, A Discursive, Space: Interviews with Jean Daive tr. Norma Cole. (Duration Press, 1999).
- Under The Dome: Walks with Paul Celan (tr. Rosmarie Waldrop), Providence, RI: Burning Deck, 2009.
  - Work has appeared in Auster, Paul, editor, The Random House Book of Twentieth-Century French Poetry: with Translations by American and British Poets, New York: Random House, 1982 ISBN 0-394-52197-8
  - Work has also appeared in magazines including "Modern Poetry in Translation", "Avec", "New Directions 44", "Serie d’Ecriture 3".
- Under the Dome: Walks with Paul Celan (tr. Rosmarie Waldrop), (City Lights Publishers, 2020) ISBN 0872868087.

Poetry

- Décimale Blanche (1967)
- Fut Bâti (1973)
- L'Absolu reptilien (1975)
- N, M, U (1975)
- Le Cri-cerveau (1977)
- Narration d'équilibre 1 : Antériorité du scandale, 2 : « Sllt », 3 : Vingt-quatre images seconde (1982)
- Un transitif (1984)
- Narration d'équilibre 4 : W (1985)
- Narration d'équilibre 5 : America domino (1987)
- Narration d'équilibre 6 : Alphabet, 7 : Une Leçon de musique, 8 : Grammaire, 9 : Suivez l'enfant (1990),
- Trilogie du temps 1 : Objet bougé (1999)
- Trilogie du temps 2 : Le Retour passeur (2000)
- Trilogie du temps 3 : Les Axes de la terre (2001)
- Une Femme de quelques vies (2009)

Novels and récits

- Le Jeu des séries scéniques (1975)
- 1, 2, de la série non aperçue (1975)
- La Condition d'infini 1 : Un Trouble (1995)
- La Condition d'infini 2 : Le Jardin d'hiver, 3 : La Maison des blocs tombés, 4 : Le Mur d'or (1995)
- La Condition d'infini 5 : Sous la coupole (1996)
- La Condition d'infini 6 : Americana ; 7 : Un délinquant impeccable (1997)
- L'Autoportrait aux dormeuses (2000)
- Le Grand Incendie de l'Homme (2007)

Other texts

- Tapiès répliquer (1981)
- Si la neige devenait plus blanche(1985), avec Jean-Michel Alberola
- Propositions d'été induites par des énoncés d'hiver (1989)

Translations

- Paul Celan, Strette & autres poèmes (1970)
- Robert Creeley, La Fin (1997)
- Johannes Poethen, L'Espace d'un jeu (1998)

Interviews

- Anne-Marie Albiach, L'exact réel (2006)
