= Emmanuel Hocquard =

French poet (1940–2019)

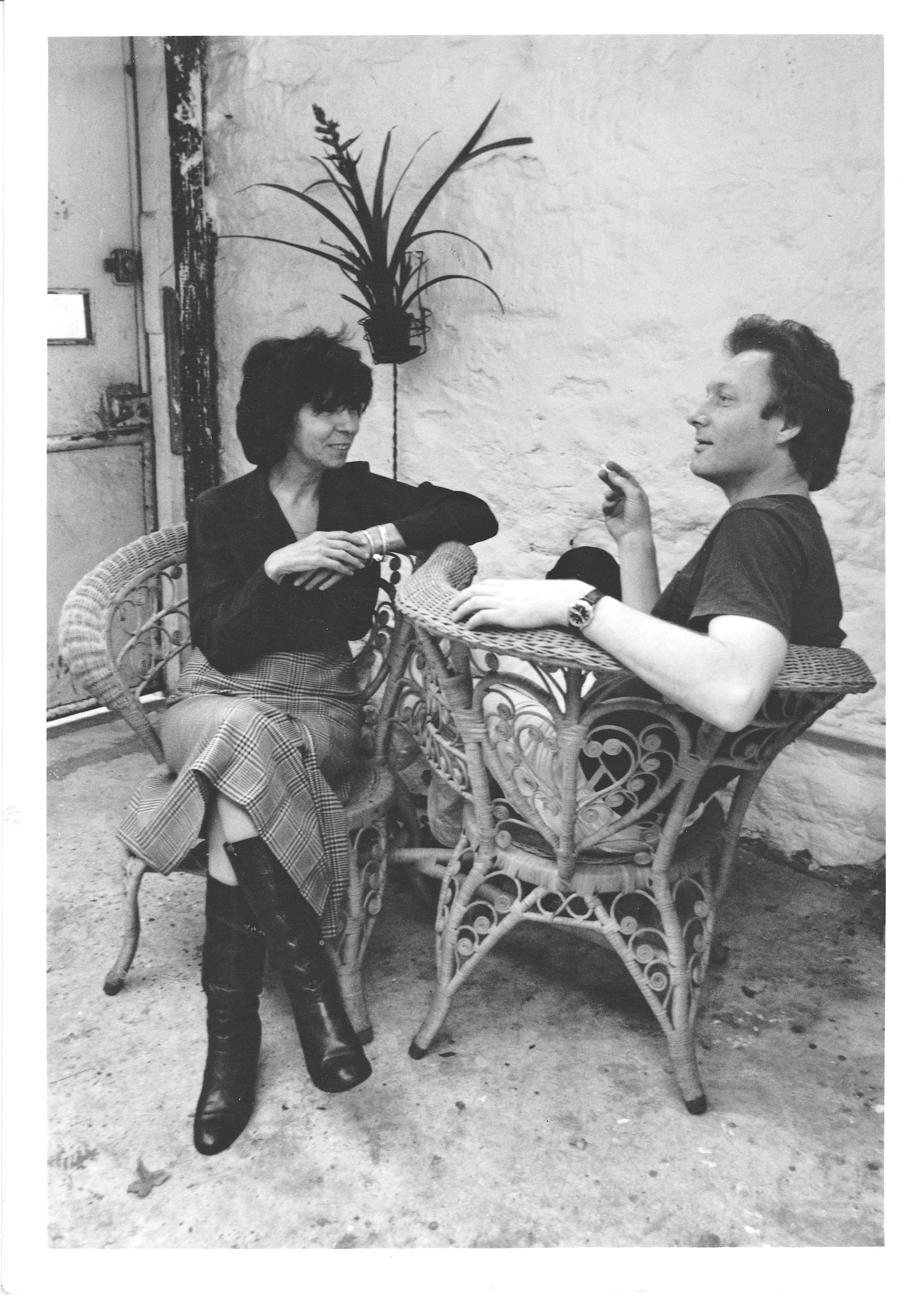
- Born: 11 April 1940; Cannes, France
- Died: 27 January 2019 (aged 78); Mérilheu, Hautes-Pyrénées, France
- Writing career
- Language: French
- Movement: "Un bureau sur l'Atlantique"

Emmanuel Hocquard (11 April 1940 – 27 January 2019) was a French poet.

== Life ==
He grew up in Tangier, Morocco. He served as the editor of the small press Orange Export Ltd. and, with Claude Royet-Journoud, edited two anthologies of new American poets, 21+1: Poètes américains ď aujourďhui (with a corresponding English volume, 21+1 American Poets Today) and 49+1. In 1989, Hocquard founded and directed "Un bureau sur l'Atlantique", an association fostering relations between French and American poets.

Besides poetry, he has written essays, a novel, and translated American and Portuguese poets including Charles Reznikoff, Michael Palmer, Paul Auster, Benjamin Hollander, Antonio Cisneros, and Fernando Pessoa. With the artist Alexandre Delay, he made a video film, Le Voyage à Reykjavik.

== Awards and honors ==
- 2013 Best Translated Book Award, shortlist, The Invention of Glass

== Books in English translation ==
- A Day in the Strait, translated by Maryann De Julio & Jane Staw, (Red Dust, New York, 1985); "narration"
- Late Additions, translated by Rosmarie Waldrop and Connell McGrath, "Serie d'Ecriture Nº 2", (Spectacular Diseases, Peterborough, UK, 1988); poems
- Elegies & Other Poems, translated by John A. Scott, (Shearsman Books, Plymouth, UK, 1989) ISBN 9780907562153; poetry
- Aerea in the Forests of Manhattan, translated by Lydia Davis, (The Marlboro Press, Marlboro, Vermont, 1992) ISBN 9780910395892; novel
- Of Mists and Clouds, translated by Mark Hutchinson, (The Noble Rider, Paris).
- Elegy 7, translated by Pam Rehm & Keith Waldrop, "Serie d'Ecriture Nº 7", (Burning Deck, Providence (RI), 1993); poetry
- Theory of Tables, translated by Michael Palmer, Afterword translation by Norma Cole, (Providence, RI: O-blek editions, 1994); poems
- The Garden of Sallust and other writings, translated by Mark Hutchinson, (The Noble Rider, Paris, 1995).
- The Library at Trieste, translated by Mark Hutchinson, (The Noble Rider, Paris) ISBN 9782950876218; a talk given in 1987 at the University of California, San Diego
- This Story Is Mine: Little Autobiographical Dictionary of Elegy translated by Norma Cole, (Instress, 1999); poems
- Codicil & Plan for Pond 4, translated by Ray DiPalma & Juliette Valéry, (The Post Apollo Press, 1999) ISBN 9780942996395; poems
- A Test of Solitude: Sonnets, translated by Rosmarie Waldrop, (Burning Deck, Providence (RI), 2000) ISBN 9781886224339; poems
- Conditions of Light, translated by Jean-Jacques Poucel, (Fence Books/La Presse, 2010) ISBN 9781934200193; poems
- The Invention of Glass, translated by Cole Swensen and Rod Smith, (Canarium Books, 2012) ISBN 9780982237694; poems
