= Anne-Marie Albiach =

French poet and translator

- Born: 9 August 1937
- Died: 4 November 2012 (aged 75)
- Citizenship: French
- Writing career
- Language: French
- Genres: poetry; translation
- Movements: Claude Royet-Journoud, Emmanuel Hocquard

Anne-Marie Albiach (9 August 1937 – 4 November 2012) was a contemporary French poet and translator.

== Overview ==
Anne-Marie Albiach's was a renowned French poet and writer born in Saint -Nazaire, France on 9 August 1937. Anne- Marie Albiach became well known with the publication of her poetry titled état in 1971. Albiach is a respected and an influential figure for her contribution to contemporary Women's poetry. Anne-Marie was known to originate her personal experiences pared down to impersonal and for deviating from traditional syntax and semantics. Albiach is also known for her famous poetry collection Mezza Voce. In the opening section of Mezza Voce, Albiach's interest in the intersecting trajectories of language and the body is articulated through discursive cadences of prose poetry characterized by, among other things, inventive use of spacing on the printed page. With Claude Royet-Journoud and Michel Couturier, she co-edited the magazine Siécle a mains, where she first published her translation of Louis Zukofsky's "A-9".

Today, Albiach is associated in France with poets Claude Royet-Journoud and Emmanuel Hocquard, all three being, at various times, translated and published by the American poets Keith Waldrop and Rosmarie Waldrop via Burning Deck, their influential small press.

== Works ==
- État (1971); in English: tr. Keith Waldrop. (Windsor, VT: Awede Press, 1989) ISBN 0-942433-13-0
- Mezza Voce (1984); in English: tr. Joseph Simas in collaboration with Anthony Barnett, Lydia Davis & Douglas Oliver. (Sausalito, CA: Post-Apollo Press, 1988) ISBN 0-942996-11-9
- Anawratha (1984)
- Figure Vocative (1985); in English: "Vocative Figure", tr. Anthony Barnett & Joseph Simas. (Allardyce Books, 1992) ISBN 0-907954-18-9
- Le chemin de l'hermitage (1986)
- A Geometry, tr. Keith & Rosmarie Waldrop. (Providence, RI: Burning Deck, 1998) ISBN 1-886224-31-5
- A Discursive, Space: Interviews with Jean Daive, tr. Norma Cole. (Duration Press, 1999).
- Two Poems: Flammigère & the Line ... the Loss tr. Peter Riley (Shearsman Books, 2004)
- Figured Image (tr. Keith Waldrop of Figurations de l'image ). (Post-Apollo Press, 2006) ISBN 978-0-942996-59-3

== Critical works on Albiach's writing and interviews ==
- Wellman, Donald. Albiach / Celan / Reading Across Languages (Annex 2016) 978-09975496-0-7.
- Daive, Jean. "Urgency and Negation as Response: Anne-Marie Albiach and Paul Celan" in Albiach / Celan / Reading Across Languages.
- Collected Interviews with Jean Daive, in French, under the title: Anne-Marie Albiach L'Exact Réel. (Marseille, Eric Pesty Editeur, 2006) ISBN 2-9524961-2-9
- Special issue of the CCP/ Cahier Critique de Poésie : Dossier Anne-Marie Albiach. Centre International de Poésie, Marseille : éditions farrago/Léo Scheer, Vol 5, n° 1, 2002/2003.
- Gleize, Jean-Marie. Anne-Marie Albiach. Paris, Seghers, 1992.
  - Le Théâtre du poème : vers Anne-Marie Albiach. Paris, éd. Belin, 1995. (Coll. l'extrême contemporaine.)
  - « Poésie flammigère » A noir. Paris, Seuil, 1992. pp 209–223. (Coll. fiction & cie.)
- Nelson, Gale. « Works of Anne-Marie Albiach [Etat, Mezza Voce], Susan Howe and Edmond Jabès » in Cathay, USA, 1993.
- Nuridsany, Michel. « Souveraine Anne-Marie Albiach » in Le Figaro newspaper, Paris, Friday 27 April 1984.
- Ramos, Peter. "On Abiach" in Verse Magazine (published by Univ. of Richmond, VA, USA) Special issue on: "French Poetry & Poetics", v 24, n°s 1–3, 2007. pp 319–321.
- Simas, Joseph. « Entretien avec Joseph Simas » followed by « Notes en marge de l'entretien » by Anne-Marie ALBIACH, Ex n°4, second trimestre 1985. Re-published in the magazine Nioques n°3 under the title « Anne-marie ALBIACH et Joseph SIMAS, Entretien du 13 Juillet 1984 », June 1991.
- Swensen, Cole. « Against the Limits of Language: The Geometries of Anne-Marie Albiach and Susan Howe. » in Moving Borders: Three Decades of Innovative Writing By Women. ed. Mary Margaret SLOAN. Jersey City, New Jersey, Talisman House Publishers, 1998. pp 630–641.
