= William Bronk =

American poet (1918–1999)

- Born: 17 February 1918; Fort Edward, New York
- Died: 22 February 1999 (aged 81); Hudson Falls, New York
- Occupation: Poet
- Writing career
- Genres: Poetry, Essay
- Notable awards: National Book Award; 1982

William Bronk (February 17, 1918 – February 22, 1999) was an American poet. For his book, Life Supports (1981), he won the National Book Award for Poetry.

He was also a veteran of World War II and a businessman. After teaching at Union College for a brief period, he took over the family business of Bronk Coal and Lumber after his father's early death. He ran it for 30 years in Hudson Falls, New York.

== Life and work ==
William Bronk was born in 1918 in a house on Lower Main Street in Fort Edward, New York. He had an older brother, Sherman, who died young, and two older sisters, Jane and Betty. Their mother was a homemaker and their father ran his business, Bronk Coal and Lumber, in Hudson Falls. The children all attended local public schools. Bronk attended Dartmouth College for higher education, being admitted at age 16. He took graduate classes at Harvard for another semester. He said later that he "decided I couldn't take any more of that."

Bronk was drafted into the Army soon after the United States entered World War II. After serving as a private, he was admitted to OCS, and was commissioned as an officer after completion of the program. He was honorably discharged from the Army in October 1945.

He first taught English at Union College, Schenectady, New York. He left Union in June 1946 and returned to Hudson Falls. During the latter half of 1946, he completed work on The Brother in Elysium. In January 1947 Bronk took over management of the Bronk Coal and Lumber Company, which he had inherited in 1941 when his father died unexpectedly. Although he intended this work to be temporary, he ran the business for 30 years, retiring in 1978.

Bronk said that the poems emerged in his mind as he went through the business of the day. When one was ready, he put it on paper, working in longhand rather than at a typewriter. As his manuscripts attest, he seldom rewrote or modified a poem once he wrote it on paper.

William Bronk died Monday, February 22, 1999.

=== Selected bibliography ===
Poetry

- Light and Dark, Origin Press, 1956, 2nd edition, Elizabeth Press, 1975.
- The World, the Worldless, New Directions, 1964.
- The Empty Hands, Elizabeth Press, 1969.
- That Tantalus, Elizabeth Press, 1971.
- Utterances: The Loss of Grass, Trees, Water: The Unbecoming of Wanted and Wanter, Burning Deck, 1972.
- To Praise the Music, Elizabeth Press, 1972.
- Looking at It, Sceptre Press, 1973.
- A Partial Glossary: Two Essays, Elizabeth Press, 1974.
- The Stance, Graywolf Press, 1975.
- Silence and Metaphor, Elizabeth Press, 1975.
- Finding Losses, Elizabeth Press, 1976.
- The Meantime, Elizabeth Press, 1976.
- My Father Photographed with Friends and Other Pictures, Elizabeth Press, 1976.
- Twelve Losses Found, Grosseteste, 1976.
- That Beauty Still, Burning Deck, 1978.
- Life Supports: New and Collected Poems, North Point Press (San Francisco, CA), 1981. —winner of the National Book Award
- Light in a Dark Sky, William Ewert, 1982.
- Careless Love and Its Apostrophes, Red Ozier Press, 1985.
- Manifest; And Furthermore, North Point Press (San Francisco, CA), 1987.
- Death Is the Place (poems), North Point Press (San Francisco, CA), 1989.
- Living Instead (poems), North Point Press (San Francisco, CA), 1991.
- Some Words (poems), Asphodel Press (Mount Kisco, NY), 1992.
- The Mild Day (poems), Talisman House (Hoboken, NJ), 1993.
- Our Selves (poems), Talisman House (Hoboken, NJ), 1994.
- Selected Poems, selected by Henry Weinfield, New Directions Publishing (New York, NY), 1995.
- The Cage of Age (poems), Talisman House (Hoboken, NJ), 1996.
- Life Supports (poems), Talisman House (Hoboken, NJ), 1997.
- All of What We Loved (poems), Talisman House (Hoboken, NJ), 1998.
- Some Words (poems), Talisman House (Hoboken, NJ), 1998.
- Metaphor of Trees and Last Poems, Talisman House (Hoboken, NJ), 1999.
- Estival: The Keepsakes Collection, Richard A. Carella, Publisher (Hudson Falls, New York), 2011.
- Bursts of Light: The Collected Later Poems, Talisman House (Hoboken, NJ), 2012.

Essays

- The New World, Elizabeth Press, 1974.
- The Brother in Elysium, Elizabeth Press, 1980.
- Vectors and Smoothable Curves, North Point Press (San Francisco, CA), 1983, new edition, Talisman House (Hoboken, NJ), 1997.
