= Barbara Guest =

American writer

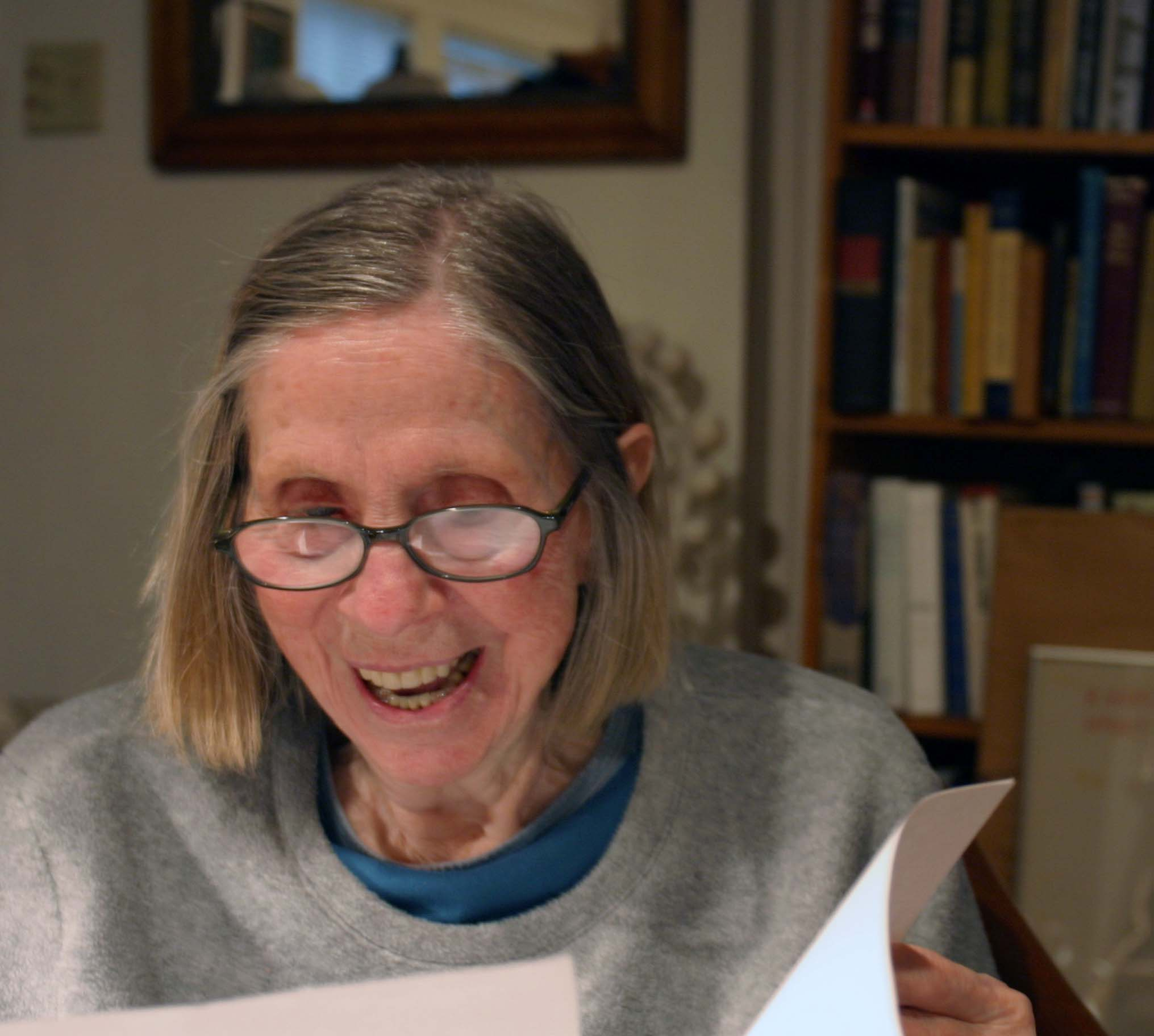

Barbara Guest, née Barbara Ann Pinson (September 6, 1920 – February 15, 2006), was an American poet and prose stylist. Guest first gained recognition as a member of the first generation New York School of poetry. Guest wrote more than 15 books of poetry spanning sixty years of writing. In 1999, she was awarded the Frost Medal for Lifetime Achievement by the Poetry Society of America.

Guest also wrote art criticism, essays, a novel, biography, plays, and other prose pieces since collected in Meditations: The Assorted Prose of Barbara Guest. Her collages appeared on the covers of several of her books of poetry. She was also well known for her biography of the poet H.D., Herself Defined: The Poet H.D. and Her World (1984).

== Early life and education ==
Born in Wilmington, North Carolina and raised in California, Guest attended UCLA, and then earned a B.A. in General Curriculum-Humanities in 1943 at UC Berkeley. She worked as an editorial associate at ARTnews magazine from 1951 to 1959.

== Poetry ==
Barbara Guest wrote more than 15 books of poetry spanning sixty years of writing. "Her poems begin in the midst of action," wrote Peter Gizzi in his introduction to a collection of her work, "but their angle of perception is oblique." Her poems are known for their abstract quality, vivid language, and intellectualism. She believed that the subject of the poem finds itself through the writing of the poem and through the poet's imagination. "Disturbing the conventional relations of subjects and objects, of reality and imagination, is one of Guest's signature gestures," noted Gizzi.

Among her most well-known poems are "Parachutes, My Love, Could Carry Us Higher," (MP3) "Wild Gardens Overlooked by Night Lights, (MP3)" "Roses," and "Photographs."

== Quotes ==
The subject matter finds itself...You find the subject as you proceed with (writing) the poem.

— Barbara Guest, Interview on LINEBreak with Charles Bernstein. 1995

Poetry is where the concrete object is bathed in a new atmosphere lifted out of itself to become a fiction. The poet is not there only to share a poetic communication but to stimulate an imaginative speculation on the nature of reality.

— Barbara Guest, Lecture titled "How I Got Out of Poetry and into Prose." 1992.

The poet wishes to align the contents of the poem with the vision which directs it. When this occurs, we say of a poem that it has wings. It is possible that words may occur in a fixed space and sequences so that they are called words of a poem. We say this poem is made of words. It is true many poems are constructed solely of words. These are the words that sit on paper without vision. We have all read these poems and we know after we have read them, we feel curiously bereft. Our expectations of enoblement by the poem have been disappointed by the lackluster condition of the poem. We decide that this poem is not very inspired. And what do we mean by this? We desired inspiration that the poem contained within it, the spirit of poetry. We have learned that words are only utensils. They are inorganic unless there is a spirit within the poem, to elevate it, to give it wings so that the poem may soar above the page and enter our consciousness where we may, if we wish, give it a long life.

— Barbara Guest, Lecture titled "How I Got Out of Poetry and into Prose." 1992.

(Imagination) is something fluid which can twist itself into a poem.

— Barbara Guest, Interview on LINEBreak with Charles Bernstein. 1995

== Selected bibliography ==
Poetry

- The Location of Things (Tibor de Nagy, 1960)
- Poems: The Location of Things, Archaics, The Open Skies (Doubleday & Company, 1962)
- The Open Skies (1962)
- The Blue Stairs (Corinth Books, 1968)
- I Ching, with lithographs by Sheila Isham (Mourlot Graphics, 1969).
- Moscow Mansions (Viking, 1973)
- The Countess from Minneapolis (Burning Deck Press, 1976)
- Seeking Air (Black Sparrow, 1977; reprint, Los Angeles: Sun & Moon Press, 1997; Grand Iota, 2021)
- The Türler Losses (Montréal: Mansfield Book Mart, 1979)
- Biography (Burning Deck, 1980)
- Quilts (Vehicle Edition, 1981)
- Herself Defined: The Poet H. D. and Her World (Doubleday & Company, 1984)
- Musicality, with June Felter (1988)
- Fair Realism (Sun & Moon Press, 1989)
- The Nude, Warren Brandt (Art Editions, New York, 1989)
- Defensive Rapture (Sun & Moon Press, 1993)
- The Altos, with artist Richard Tuttle (San Francisco: Hank Hine Publisher, 1993)
- Selected Poems (Sun & Moon Press, 1995)
- Stripped Tales, featuring art by Anne Dunn (Kelsey St. Press, 1995)
- Quill Solitary, Apparition (The Post-Apollo Press, 1996)
- Seeking Air (Sun & Moon Press, 1997)
- Etruscan Reader VI (with Robin Blaser and Lee Harwood) (1998)
- Outside of This, That is, with illustration by Trevor Winkfield (Z Press, 1999).
- Strings, with artist Ann Slacik (Paris, France, 1999)
- The Luminous, with artist Jane Moorman (Palo Alto, California, 1999)
- Rocks on a Platter (Wesleyan, 1999)
- If So, Tell Me (Reality Street Editions, UK, 1999)
- The Confetti Trees (Sun & Moon, 1999)
- Symbiosis, with artist Laurie Reid (Berkeley: Kelsey Street Press, 2000)
- Miniatures and Other Poems (Wesleyan University Press, 2002)
- Forces of Imagination: Writing on Writing (Kelsey Street Press, 2003)
- Durer in the Window: Reflexions on Art (Roof Books, 2003)
- The Red Gaze (Wesleyan University Press, 2005)
- Fallschirme, Gebliebter. Ausgewählte Gedichte (German, Bilingual Edition, luxbooks, 2008)
- The Collected Poems of Barbara Guest (Middletown, CT: Wesleyan University Press, 2008)

Prose

- Mediations: The Assorted Prose of Barbara Guest, edited with an introduction by Joseph Shafer (Wesleyan University Press, 2025)
- Forces of Imagination: Writing on Writing (Kelsey Street Press, 2003).
- Dürer in the Window (Roof Books, 2003).

"To speak with Barbara Guest about poetry was always to be in the presence of a fiercely uncompromised vision of the art and its obligations. Her insights continually astonished me. They were beholden to no one. And the work itself, of a lyric intelligence entirely her own. For whatever reasons, and I can sadly imagine many, it has not received its full due, but it will. The music insists."

Michael Palmer

== See also ==
- List of poets from the United States
