= Burning Deck Press =

American book publishing company

- Type: Nonprofit small press
- Industry: Publishing
- Founded: 1961
- Founders: Keith Waldrop; Rosmarie Waldrop
- Defunct: 2017
- Headquarters: United States
- Products: Experimental poetry; Experimental prose and short fiction; Literary translation series
- Website: burningdeck.com

Burning Deck was a small press specializing in the publication of experimental poetry and prose. Burning Deck was founded by the writers Keith Waldrop and Rosmarie Waldrop in 1961 and closed in 2017.

== Overview ==
Although the Waldrops initially promoted Burning Deck magazine as a "quinterly", after only four issues the periodical was transformed into a series of pamphlets. The transformation continued later until the press became a publisher of books of poetry and short fiction.

The magazine published poets from different styles and schools. The main split in poets of that time was said to be the one between the "academics" and the "beats", but Burning Deck ignored that split to the point where authors sometimes complained of being published in the company of others so different from themselves.

By 1985, the economics of publishing had changed and it became financially more feasible to print regular books on offset presses and use letterpress work for smaller chapbooks, something the Waldrops have noted in the history of the enterprise (Keith and Rosmarie Waldrop, Burning Deck: A History) they wrote and published together. The Waldrops continued to design and print books that are made to last (using smyth-sewn, acid-free paper) but tried to keep the price affordable.

== Notable books ==
Although Burning Deck was a small, nonprofit press, it published works of innovative writing, including (alphabetical by author):

- 99: The New Meaning, by Walter Abish
- A Geometry by Anne-Marie Albiach
- Why Write? by Paul Auster
- The Heat Bird, by Mei-mei Berssenbrugge
- Utterances, by William Bronk
- The Grand Hotels (of Joseph Cornell), by Robert Coover
- Striking Resemblance by Tina Darragh
- Species of Intoxication: Extracts from the Leaves of the Doctor Ordinaire by Michael Gizzi
- Artificial Heart, by Peter Gizzi
- The Countess from Minneapolis, by Barbara Guest
- Innocence in extremis by John Hawkes
- My Life, by Lyn Hejinian
- A Test of Solitude by Emmanuel Hocquard
- Some Other Kind of Mission by Lisa Jarnot
- Realism by Tom Mandel
- Trial Impressions by Harry Mathews
- i.e. by Claude Royet-Journoud
- Numen, by Cole Swensen
- The Windows Flew Open, by Marjorie Welish
- Turneresque, by Elizabeth Willis

== Translation ==
Burning Deck published two series of translation: Serie d'ecriture presented a new book of contemporary French poetry each year; Dichten= presented an annual volume of contemporary German writing.
