= Roger Giroux =

French poet

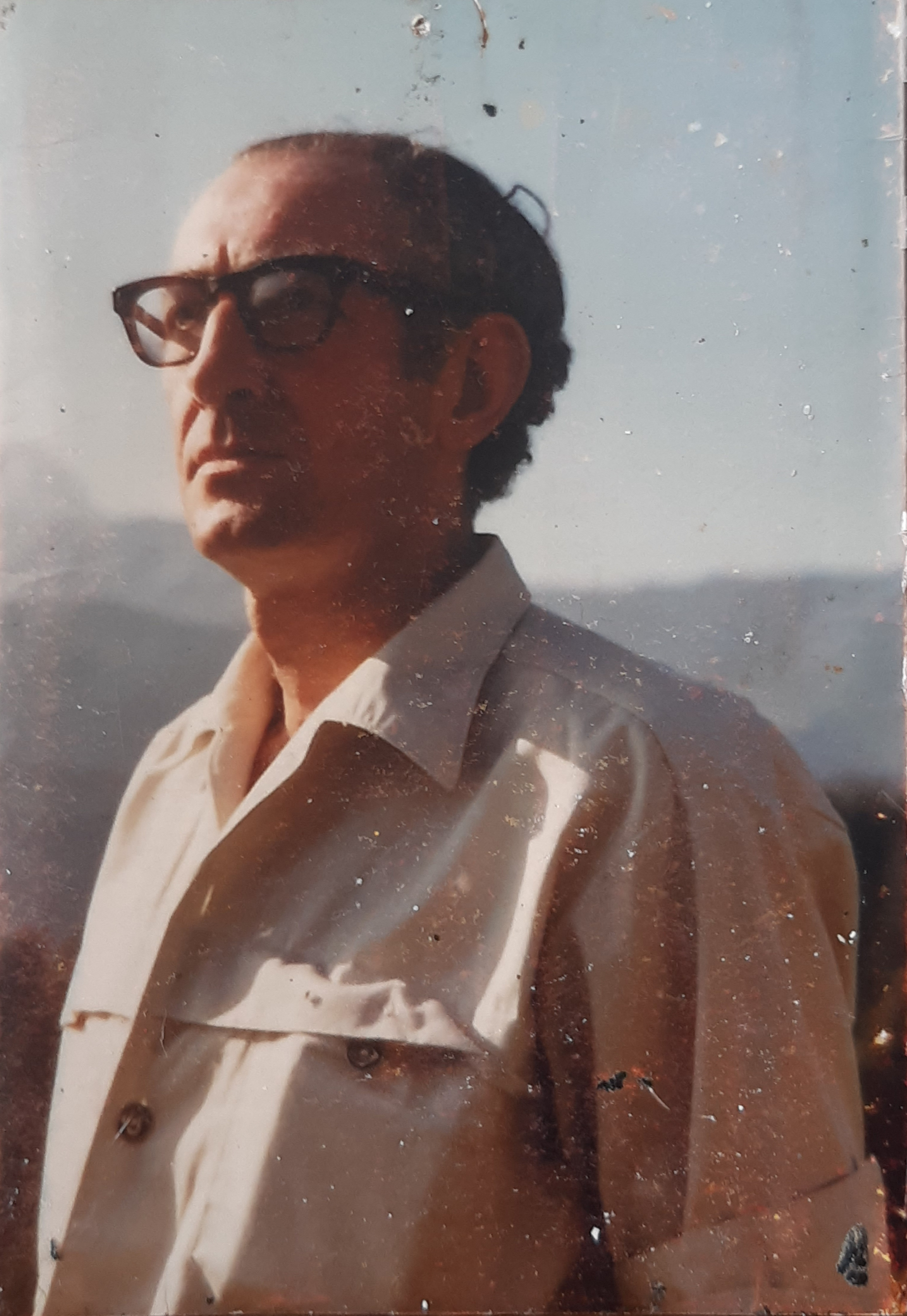
Roger Giroux

Roger Giroux (1925–1974) was a French poet and translator.

Giroux's only book published when he was alive was L’arbre le temps, Mercure de France, 1964; it won the Max-Jacob' Prize that same year.

Giroux translated texts of W. B. Yeats, Lawrence Durrell, Rosmarie Waldrop, Edna O'Brien, Henry Miller and others authors in French.

A sample of his poems is included in The Random House Book of Twentieth-Century French Poetry, edited by Paul Auster, and generally recognized as the best anthology of Modern French poetry in English translation. Collection of poetry: L'autre temps (1964). Posthumous works: Voici (1974), Théâtre (1976), S (1977), L'arbre le Temps suivi de Lieu-Je et de Lettre (1977). More recently: Poème (éd. Théâtre typographique, 2007) and Journal d'un poème (éd. Eric Pesty, 2011).
