= Peter Gizzi =

American poet

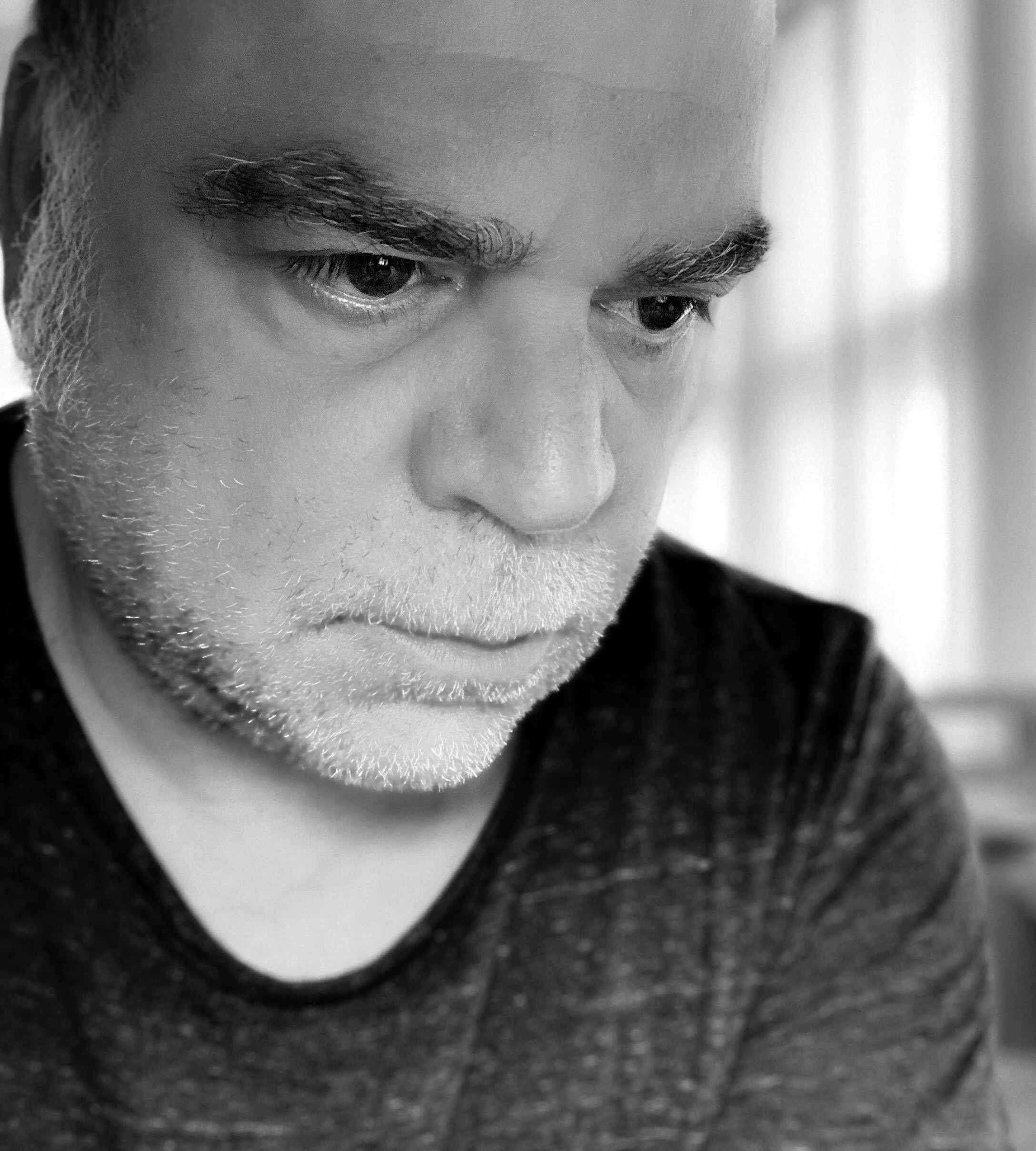
- Peter Gizzi, 2020.
- Born: 1959 (age 66–67); Alma, Michigan
- Education: Brown University, New York University, University at Buffalo
- Occupation: Writer
- Writing career
- Genre: Poetry

Peter Gizzi (born 1959 in Alma, Michigan) is an American poet, essayist, editor and teacher. He attended New York University, Brown University and the State University of New York at Buffalo.

== Life ==
Gizzi was born in Alma, Michigan to an Italian American family. He spent most of his childhood and adolescence in Pittsfield, Massachusetts. Gizzi has said that he "internalized the hierarchy of music over words as a kid at Catholic mass, where the liturgy was often in Latin". After graduating from high school, the poet delayed going to college and took a job in a factory winding resin tubes and in a residential treatment center working with emotionally disturbed adolescents. Working overnight at the treatment center, Gizzi read George Oppen's Collected Poems, along with H.D., Wallace Stevens, William Carlos Williams, Federico García Lorca, Baudelaire, Rimbaud "and almost anything published by Burning Deck." Living in New York City, in part to keep in touch with the punk scene, he walked by the St. Mark's book store one day and his eye was caught by a reprinted version of BLAST, with its shocking pink and diagonal title. He picked up a copy and read the manifestos. "I was home in that synthesis — Punk and Poetry had merged and I knew at once I wanted to edit my own journal and so I did," he later wrote.

By the late 1980s, he was waiting tables, reading and editing o•blék: a journal of language arts, which he founded in 1987 with Connell McGrath.

In 1991, he started editing the lectures of Jack Spicer for publication and went to SUNY Buffalo with support from Robert Creeley, Charles Bernstein, and Susan Howe, "and with the financial support (meager as it was) that working within an institution offered." In 1993, after eight years and 12 issues, he left o•blék, which soon folded.

Gizzi has taught at Brown University and the University of California, Santa Cruz. Since 2001, he has been a professor in the MFA Program for Poets & Writers at University of Massachusetts Amherst. For several years, he was poetry editor at The Nation. He also is on the contributing editorial board to the literary journal Conjunctions. He is the brother of deceased poet Michael Gizzi.

== Poetry ==
In 1992 Peter Gizzi published his first full-length collection, "Periplum" which won praise from critics. This was followed by "Artificial Heart", a collection which enhanced Gizzi's reputation as a lyric poet writing as a modern troubadour in a style which is allusive and oblique.

In 2003, "Some Values of Landscape and Weather" was published. The title poem of this collection is "a sustained examination of the relationship between public and private spaces, as well as a complex reflection on war".

The collection "The Outernationale" (2007) investigates language, knowledge and experience but combines this with an implied political stance.

"Threshold Songs" (2011) is a series of poetic elegies which also investigate the role of the lyric poet and show "the voice of the poet contemplating its relation to other voices".

Gizzi's collection, "Archeophonics", continued his investigation of language; the title of the book refers to the excavation of lost sounds analogous to the process of archeology. Gizzi's most recent collection, "Fierce Elegy" (2023) provides "ongoing sense of loss coupled with resistance". Critic James O'Connor maintains that in "Fierce Elegy "we find the poet writing at the height of his powers." According to O'Connor, the book’s final poem, 'Consider the Wound,' "is an achievement of singular beauty".

== Awards and recognition ==
In 1994 he received the Lavan Younger Poets Award from the Academy of American Poets (selected by John Ashbery). Gizzi has also held residencies at the MacDowell Colony, Yaddo, The Foundation of French Literature at Royaumont, Un Bureau Sur L’Atlantique, and the Centre International de Poesie Marseille. He has received fellowships from The Fund For Poetry, The Rex Foundation, The Howard Foundation, The Foundation for Contemporary Arts Grants to Artists award (1998), and The John Simon Guggenheim Memorial Foundation. Gizzi has twice held the position of Poet-in-Residence in the English Faculty of the University of Cambridge. In 2016 Archeophonics was a finalist for the National Book Award. In 2024, he won the Poetry Award for Fierce Elegy at the 24th annual Massachusetts Book Awards. The collection won the 2024 T. S. Eliot Prize.

== Bibliography ==
=== Books ===
- Fierce Elegy. Middletown: Wesleyan, 2023
- Now It's Dark. Middletown: Wesleyan, 2020
- Sky Burial: New and Selected Poems. Manchester, UK: Carcanet, 2020
- Archeophonics. Middletown: Wesleyan, 2016
- In Defense of Nothing: Selected Poems 1987–2011. Middletown: Wesleyan, 2014
- Threshold Songs. Middletown: Wesleyan, 2011
- The Outernationale. Middletown: Wesleyan, 2007
- Periplum and other poems, 1987–92. Cambridge, UK: Salt Publishers, 2004
- Some Values of Landscape and Weather. Middletown: Wesleyan, 2003
- Artificial Heart. Providence: Burning Deck, 1998
- Periplum. Penngrove: Avec Books, 1992

=== Chapbooks and Limited Editions ===
- Romanticism. London: Distance No Object, 2023
- Ship of State. Kingston: The Brother in Elysium, 2020
- Peter Gizzi. Cambridge: Earthbound Poetry Series, 2020
- The Afterlife of Paper. Los Angeles: Catalpa, 2019
- New Poems. Kingston: The Brother in Elysium, 2017
- Field Recordings. Cambridge UK: Equipage Editions, 2016
- A Winding Sheet for Summer. Amsterdam NL: Tungsten Press, 2016
- Marigold & Cable: A Garland for the New Year. Cambridge UK: Materials, 2016
- The Winter Sun Says Fight. Plymouth UK: Periplum Editions, 2016
- Vincent, Homesick for the Land of Pictures. Rotterdam, NL: Studio 3005, 2015
- Marigold & Cable. Saint-Martin, France: Shelter Press, 2014
- In the Air. Los Angeles: Manor House, 2013
- Ode: Salute to the New York School 1950-1970. Tucson: Letter Machine, 2012
- History Is Made at Night. Cincinnati: Students of Decay, 2011
- Pinocchio's Gnosis. Northampton: Song Cave, 2011
- In Song & Story. Amsterdam, NL: Tungsten Press, 2010
- Homer's Anger. Paris: Collectif Generation, 2009
- A Panic That Can Still Come Upon Me. Brooklyn, Ugly Ducking, 2006
- From a Cinematographer's Letter. London: Tolling Elves. 2004
- Revival. New Haven: Phylum Press, 2002
- Fin Amor. Oakland: Tougher Disguises, 2002
- Chateâu If. Paris: Slacik Editions, 2000
- Add This to the House. Cambridge, UK: Equipage, 1999
- New Picnic Time. Buffalo: Meow Editions, 1995
- Ledger Domain. Providence: Timoleon, 1995
- Hours of the Book. Canary Islands, Spain: Zasterle Press, 1994
- Music for Films. Providence: Paradigm Press, 1992
- Creeley Madrigal. Providence: The Materials Press, 1991

=== Editing Projects ===
- My Vocabulary Did This to Me: The Collected Poetry of Jack Spicer. Co-edited with Kevin Killian. Middletown: Wesleyan, 2008
- The House that Jack Built: The Collected Lectures of Jack Spicer. Middletown: Wesleyan University, 1998
- Exact Change Yearbook. Boston: Exact Change Publishers / Manchester, UK: Carcanet, 1995
- o•blēk / a journal of language arts. 12 issues. Co-edited with Connell McGrath. 1987 - 93
