= Michael Gizzi =

American poet

Michael Gizzi (1949 – September 27, 2010) was an American poet, teacher, and licensed arborist.

== Life ==
Michael Gizzi was born in Schenectady, New York, in 1949, to Carolyn and Anthony Gizzi. He had two brothers, Peter and Thomas Gizzi. He spent part of his childhood living in Ohio and later lived in East Greenwich, Rhode Island, for three years of high school (10th, 11th, and 12th grade). His parents moved to Pittsfield, Massachusetts, but he later returned to Rhode Island as an undergraduate student at Brown University. He graduated from Brown University with a Bachelor of Arts in 1976, and returned to Brown to earn his Master of Arts degree in English in June 1977. There he worked alongside colleagues Bob Kessler, Jade D'Aquilarive "JD" Benson (born Denice Joan Deitch), Julia Thacker, playwright Andrea Hairston, fiction writer Alex Londres (life partner of attorney Geoffrey Bowers; see movie Philadelphia) and others, in workshops and readings. He attended the Masters program with the support of mentor Keith Waldrop who ultimately connected him to the Burning Deck community of poets and artists.

== Early career ==
Around this time he married his first wife, fellow artist Ippy Patterson, and his daughter, Pilar, was born. They purchased a home in Rehoboth, Massachusetts, where he worked for seven years as an arborist and tree surgeon in southeastern New England to support his family. After receiving his AM, he moved to the Berkshires in western Massachusetts where he worked collaboratively with Clark Coolidge on a Jack Kerouac-inspired series. This work with Coolidge cemented a long-lasting friendship in work and in life. In the early 1990s, Gizzi began teaching English and creative writing at Lenox High School, which he did for several years.

== Literary career ==
In the late 1990s, he moved back to Providence, Rhode Island. At this time he was married to his second wife, Rhode Island School of Design (RISD) graduate and collage artist, Barbieo (Barros). He worked as adjunct faculty and visiting professor at Roger Williams University and Brown University. He officially started work as an adjunct creative writing professor at Roger Williams University in 2005 and worked for three more years as a visiting professor there. Due to financial constraints, Roger Williams could not ask Gizzi back in the fall of 2009, so he worked as a visiting professor in literary arts at Brown during this time and coordinated a number of poetry readings and projects, such as the Down City Poetry Series on campus. During this period, Gizzi established himself in literary circles as an author and editor through his connection to the Waldrops and other noted poets.

He authored over ten books of poetry, including: Bird As, Avis, Species of Intoxication, New Depths of Deadpan, My Terza Rima and No Both. Both of his wives, Ippy and Barbieo, contributed artwork for covers of his books. His works were published by Burning Deck Press, Hard Press, and Roof, among others, and he would work as an editor for some of these companies. An indicative reflection of these relationships is highlighted in his work as editor of Lingo magazine which functioned as a component of Hard Press from 1992–1998. During this time he edited works from writers such as Bernadette Mayer, Jim Brodey, Merrill Gilfillan, and Trevor Winkfield.

In 1996 and 2007, Gizzi was awarded the Gertrude Stein Award for Innovative Writing. In early 2000, Gizzi collaborated with Craig Watson (whom he met for the first time in 1976 at the Waldrops' home) to open the publishing company Qua Books. Their first published work was John Ashbery's As Umbrellas Follow Rain in 2002. Their second published work was George Stanley's A Tall, Serious Girl in 2003. In addition, he worked on outside projects as well, such as lyrics for music scores.

It was no secret that at different times in his life Michael struggled with alcoholism and depression and had periods of healing on both counts.

Michael Gizzi died Monday, September 27, 2010, in his Providence home at the age of 61.

== Awards ==
- 2007, 1996 Gertrude Stein Award, for Innovative Writing
- 1995 Fund for Poetry Grant
- 1991, 1987 Massachusetts Foundation Grant
- 2010 Foundation for Contemporary Arts Grants to Artists Award

== Works ==
- My Grandfather's Pants, Bench Press (1973)
- Carmela Bianca, Bonewhistle Press, 1974, ISBN 978-0-914298-08-3
- Bird As, Burning Deck (1976)
- Avis, Burning Deck (1979)
- Species of Intoxication, Burning Deck, 1983, ISBN 978-0-930901-10-3
- Just Like a Real Italian Kid, The Figures (1990)
- Continental Harmony, Roof Books, 1991, ISBN 978-0-937804-41-4
- Egyptian in hortulus, Paradigm Press, 1991, ISBN 978-0-945926-19-1
- Interferon, The Figures, 1995, ISBN 978-0-935724-73-8
- No Both, Hard Press/The Figures, 1997, ISBN 978-1-889097-16-9
- Too much Johnson. Geoffrey Young. 1999. ISBN 978-0-935724-96-7.
- Cured in the going bebop, Paradigm Press, 2001, ISBN 978-0-945926-61-0
- My Terza Rima. Great Barrington, MA: Geoffrey Young. 2001. ISBN 978-1-930589-10-0.
- New Depths of Deadpan. Providence, RI: Burning Deck Press, 2009, ISBN 978-1-886224-96-4

== Non-fiction ==
- "Robert Creeley: In Appreciation", 7 April 2005, The Providence Journal

== Reviews ==
- John Yau (September 2009). "POETRY: After the Road". The Brooklyn Rail.
