= Edmond Jabès =

French writer & poet (1912–1991)

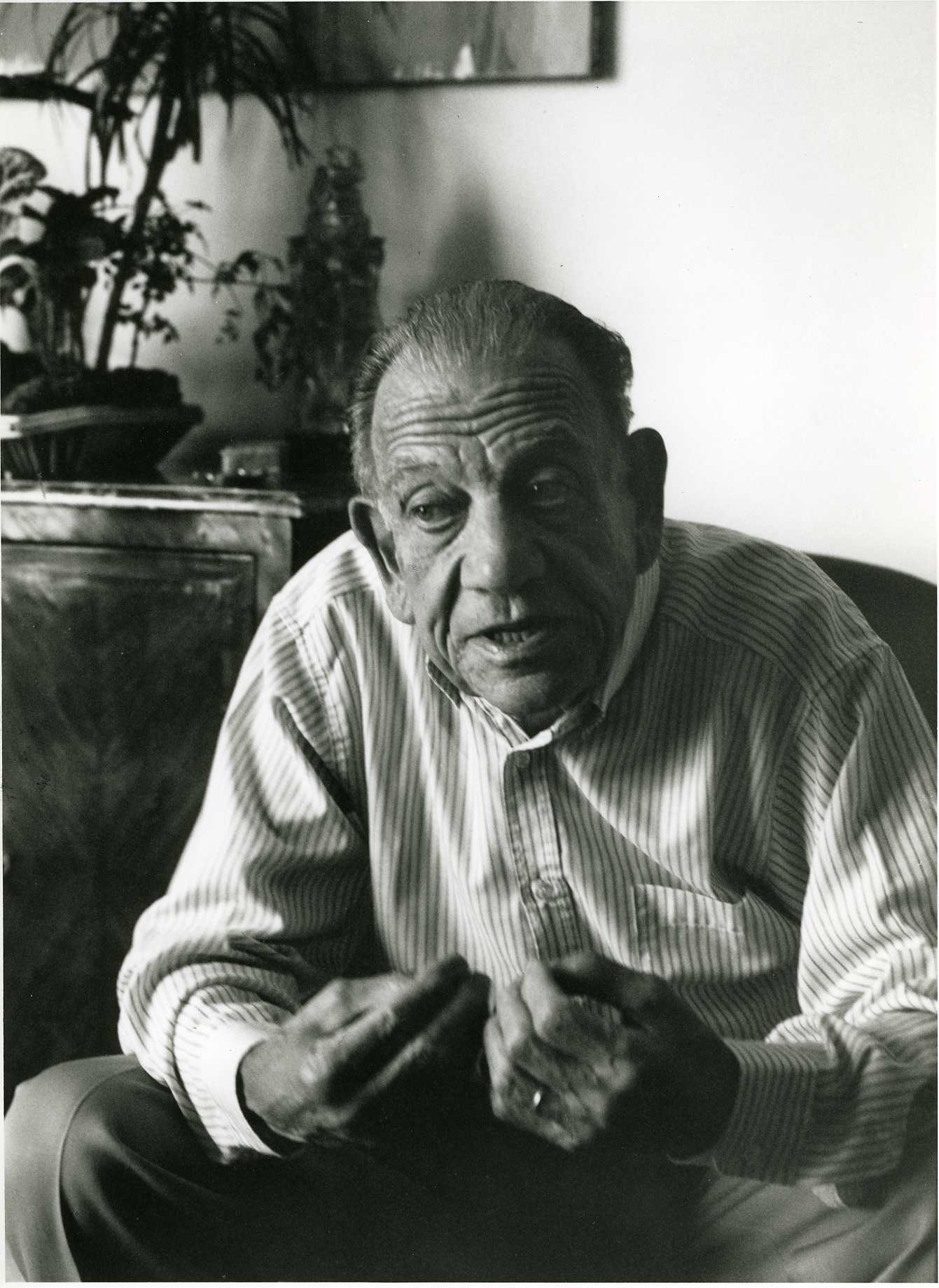
Edmond Jabès

Edmond Jabès (French: [ʒabɛs]; Arabic: إدمون جابيس; Cairo, 14 April 1912 – Paris, 2 January 1991) was a French writer and poet of Egyptian origin, and one of the best known literary figures writing in French after World War II. The work he produced when living in France in the late 1950s until his death in 1991 is highly original in form and breadth.

== Life ==
The son of a prominent Jewish family in Egypt going back to the 19th century, he was born and brought up in Cairo where he received a classical French education. He began publishing in French and writing for the theater at an early age. From the 1930s on, he was active in Cairo's artistic and literary avant-garde culture, while also nurturing relationships with poets and publishers in France. He was made a Knight of the Legion of Honor in 1952 for his literary accomplishments.

When Egypt expelled most of its Jewish population (Suez Crisis), Jabès fled to Paris in 1957. There he was welcomed by the literary community as a Surrealist-influenced poet, but a confrontation with French anti-semitism and the shadow of the Shoah prompted him to make a radical change in his writing, resulting in the multi-volume "Book of Questions." His work after exile from Egypt reflects a consciousness deeply troubled by the brutal reality of Auschwitz. His work exhibits a profound sense of melancholy and an acute sense that the Jew is constituted and always remains in exile. It also highlights the importance of offering welcome to foreigners, a central theme in his last book, "The Book of Hospitality." He became a French citizen in 1967; the same year he received the honor of being one of four French writers (alongside Sartre, Camus, and Lévi-Strauss) to present his works at the World Exposition in Montréal. Further accolades followed—the Prix des Critiques in 1972, and a commission as an officer in the Legion of Honor in 1986. In 1987, he received France's Grand National Prize for Poetry (Grand Prix national de la poésie). Jabès's cremation ceremony took place at Père Lachaise Cemetery a few days after his death; he was the victim of a heart attack in his apartment on the rue de l'Épée-de-Bois, dying at age 78.

== Works ==
Jabès is best remembered for his books of poetry, often published in multi-volume cycles. At least fourteen volumes have been translated by Rosmarie Waldrop, who is Jabès's primary English translator. They often feature references to Jewish mysticism and kabbalah.

== Selected bibliography ==
=== In English (trans. Rosmarie Waldrop) ===
- The Book of Questions, Wesleyan University Press, 1976–1984

I. The Book of Questions, 1976
II / III. The Book of Yukel / Return to the Book, 1977
IV / V / VI. Yaël, Elya, Aely, 1983
VII. El, or the Last Book, 1984

- The Book of Dialogue, Wesleyan University Press, 1987
- The Book of Shares, Chicago UP, 1989
- The Book of Resemblances, Wesleyan University Press, 1990

I. The Book of Resemblances, 1990
II. Intimations The Desert, 1991
III. The Ineffaceable The Unperceived, 1992

- From the Book to the Book [A Jabès Reader], Wesleyan UP, 1991
- A Foreigner Carrying in the Crook of His Arm a Tiny Book, Wesleyan UP, 1993
- The Book of Margins, Chicago UP, 1993
- The Little Book of Unsuspected Subversion, Stanford University Press, 1996
- Desire for a Beginning Dread of One Single End, Granary Books, 2001

=== In English (by other translators) ===
- A Share of Ink, [Selected Short Poems] trans. Anthony Rudolf, Menard Press, 1979
- If There Were Anywhere But Desert; Selected Poems, trans. Keith Waldrop; "Introduction" by Paul Auster, "Afterword" by Robert Duncan, Station Hill Press, 1988
- From the Desert to the Book: Dialogues with Marcel Cohen, trans. Pierre Joris, Station Hill, 1990

=== Selected works on Jabès (in English) ===
- Paul Auster, "Interview with Edmond Jabès", Montemora, #6 (1979), reprinted in The Sin of the Book
- —, "Book of the Dead", (1976), essay, published in The Art of Hunger
- Jacques Derrida, "Edmond Jabès and the Question of the Book", essay, published in Writing and Difference, Routledge, 2002
- Eric Gould, ed., The Sin of the Book: Edmond Jabès, University of Nebraska Press, 1985
- —, Studies in 20th Century Literature, 12, No.1: Edmond Jabès Issue (Fall 1987)
- Steven Jaron, Edmond Jabès: The Hazard of Exile (Oxford: Legenda, 2003)
- Warren Motte Jr., Questioning Edmond Jabès, University of Nebraska Press, 1990
- Rosmarie Waldrop, Lavish Absence: Recalling and Rereading Edmond Jabès, Wesleyan University Press, 2002
- Jason Weiss, Writing at Risk: Interviews in Paris with Uncommon Writers, University of Iowa Press, 1991
- Mark Rudman, "Questions about Questions", Diverse Voices, Story Line Press, 1992
- Gary D. Mole, "Lévinas, Blanchot, Jabès: Figures of Estrangement", University Press of Florida Press, 1997
- Aimée Israel-Pelletier, "Edmond Jabès, Jacques Hassoun, and Melancholy: The Second Exodus in the Shadow of the Holocaust" in MLN French Issue, 2008

== Notes ==
- Écrire le livre : autour d'Edmond Jabès, Actes du colloque de Cerisy, Seyssel, Champ Vallon,1989.
- Maurice BLANCHOT - L'Amitié, Paris, Gallimard,1971.
- Llewellyn BROWN - Le rythme et le chiffre : Le Livre des questions d'Edmond Jabès, Littérature n°103, Paris, Larousse,1996.
- Jaques DERRIDA - L'Écriturre et la différence, Paris, Seuil,1967.
- Edmond JABES, Marcel COHEN (entretiens), Paris, Belfond,1980.
- Daniel LANÇON - Jabès l'Egyptien, Paris, Jean-Michel Place, 1999.
