= Cole Swensen =

American poet (born 1955)

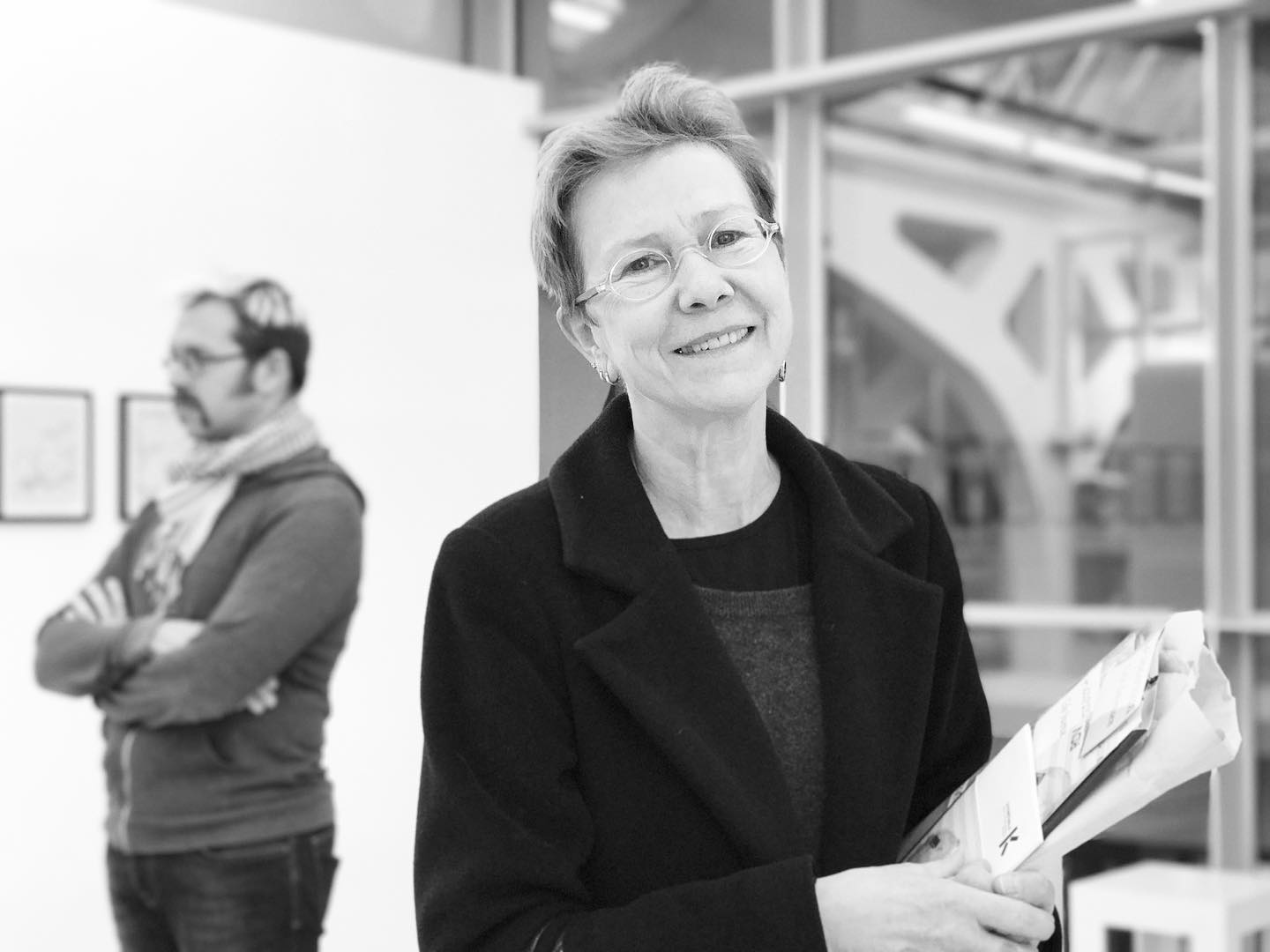
- Swensen in La Kunsthalle Mulhouse
- Born: 1955 (age 70–71); Kentfield, California, U.S.
- Education: San Francisco State University (BA, MA); University of California, Santa Cruz (PhD)
- Occupations: Poet; translator; editor; copywriter; professor

Cole Swensen (born 1955) is an American poet, translator, editor, copywriter, and professor. Swensen was awarded a 2006 Guggenheim Fellowship and is the author of more than ten poetry collections and as many translations of works from the French. She received her B.A. and M.A. from San Francisco State University and a Ph.D. in Comparative Literature from the University of California, Santa Cruz, and served as the director of the Creative Writing Program at the University of Denver. She taught at the Iowa Writers' Workshop at the University of Iowa until 2012, when she joined the faculty of Brown University's Literary Arts Program.

Her work is considered Postmodern and post-Language school, though she maintains close ties with many of the original authors from that group (such as Lyn Hejinian, Carla Harryman, Barrett Watten, Charles Bernstein,) as well as poets from all over the US and Europe. Her work is hybrid in nature, sometimes called lyric-Language poetry emerging from a strong background in the poetic and visual art traditions of both the US and France and adding to them her own vision.

In the US, Cole Swensen's ninth collection of poetry, Goest (Alice James Books, 2004) was a finalist for the National Book Award. Earlier works have been awarded a National Poetry Series selection, Sun & Moon's New American Writing Award, the Iowa Poetry Prize via University of Iowa Press, the San Francisco State Poetry Center Book Award, and two Pushcart Prizes. Her translation of Jean Frémon's The Island of the Dead won the 2004 PEN USA Literary Award for Translation. She also received the 14th annual Paul Engle Prize in 2025 for her literary and teaching work, returning to the Iowa City area to accept the award. She has also received grants from the Association Beaumarchais and the French Bureau du Livre.

== Sidelights ==
In France, Swensen has participated in readings and collaborative translation projects with such organizations as the Royaumont Foundation at the beautiful L'abbaye de Royaumont, Columbia University’s Reed Hall, the Maison des écrivains et de la littérature in Paris, Double Change and Ivy Writers Paris. Her life-long commitment to translation is a testament to her belief in the international exchange of words and language, and in the importance of radical and traditional poetries for contemporary society.

She is member of the Academy of American Poets, and a contributing editor for the periodicals American Letters & Commentary and for Shiny, and for many years was the translation editor for the online contemporary poetry and poetics review How2.

She divides her time between Paris and Providence, RI, where she is on the permanent faculty of Brown University's Literary Arts Program. She is also the founder and editor of La Presse, a small press dedicated to the translation and publication in English of contemporary French poetry (such as by Claude Royet-Journoud or Marie Borel).

== Publications ==
=== Books ===
- And And And, (Shearsman Books, 2023)
- Art in Time, (Nightboat Books, 2021)
- On Walking On, (Nightboat Books, 2017)
- Landscapes on a Train, (Nightboat Books, 2015)
- Gravesend, (University of California Press, 2012)—Finalist for the Los Angeles Times Book Prize in Poetry, 2012.
- Noise That Stays Noise, (University of Michigan Press, 2011)
- Ours: poems on the gardens of Andre Le Notre, (University of California Press, 2008) —excerpt at POOL
- The Glass Age, (Alice James Books, 2007)
- The Book of a Hundred Hands, (University of Iowa Press, Iowa City, 2005)
- NEF, a translation by Rémi Bouthonnier of Noon (Les Petits Matins, Paris, 2005)
- Goest, (Alice James Books, 2004)—Finalist for the National Book Award, 2004, and One of 12 books honored as the "Best Poetry of 2004" by Library Journal.
- Such Rich Hour, (University of Iowa Press, Iowa City, 2001)
- Oh, (Apogee Press, Berkeley, CA, 2000)—Finalist for the National Poetry Series, 1998.
- And Hand chapbook, (a+bend Press series, San Francisco, CA, 2000)
- Try, (University of Iowa Press, Iowa City, Iowa, 1999)—Winner of the Iowa Poetry Prize, 1998, and Winner of the San Francisco State Poetry Center Book Award, 2000.
- Noon, (Sun & Moon Press, Los Angeles, CA., 1997)—Winner of the New American Writing Award. Re-published with Green Integer
- Numen, (Burning Deck Press, Providence, RI, 1995)—Named an “International Book of the Year,” Times Literary Supplement, and Finalist for the PEN West Award in Poetry, 1996. It also appeared in French translation as Numen, (Fondation Royaumont, 1994)
- Parc, a translation by Pierre Alferi of Park (Format Américan France, 1995)
- Park, (Floating Island Press, Inverness, CA. 1991)
- New Math, (William Morrow & Co., New York, 1988)—Winner of the National Poetry Series, 1987
- It's Alive She Says, (Floating Island Press, CA, 1984)
- It's Like You Never Left, (Isis Press, CA, 1983)

=== Swensen's translations from the French ===
- La Vraie nature des ombres by Jean Frémon : The Real Life of Shadows, The Post Apollo Press, 2009
- Physis by Nicolas Pesquès (Parlor Press / Free Verse Editions, 2007)
- Futur, ancien, fugitif by Olivier Cadiot, as Future, Former, Fugitive (Roof Books, 2004)
- Kub or by Pierre Alferi, asOxo (Burning Deck, 2004)
- L'Ile des Morts by Jean Frémon, as: Island of the Dead (Green Integer, 2002)--awarded the 2004 PEN USA Award for Literary Translation
- Bayart by Pascalle Monnier (Black Square Editions, 2001)
- Natural Gaits by Pierre Alferi (Sun & Moon, 1995)
- Past Travels by Olivier Cadiot (1994)
- Interrmittances II by Jean Tortel (1994)

=== Other publications ===
- Swensen has written critical articles on poets such as Susan Howe, Anne-Marie Albiach or Claude Royet-Journoud, as well as reviews of poetry for such periodicals and books as:
- “The Boston Review”
- “The Bloomsbury Review”
- anthologies Moving Borders: Three Decades of Innovative Writing By Women edited by Mary Margaret Sloan, (Talisman Editions, New Jersey, 1998) and
- Civil Disobediences (Coffee House Press, 2004)
- American Hybrid: A Norton Anthology of Contemporary Poetry, (W.W. Norton & Company, 2008). Swensen co-edited (with David St. John) this anthology that includes 70 poets seen as creating cross-genre works, mixing traditional or modernist poetry techniques with experimental and postmodern writings

=== Contributions to periodicals ===
- Contributor to periodicals in English: including Chicago Review, American Poetry Review, Boston Book Review, Common Knowledge, Conjunctions, Upstairs at Duroc, Grand Street, New American Writing, and ZYZZYVA. She has also translated individual poems for print and online periodicals such as Verse, The Germ, 1913. Online at the extensive Chicago Modern Poetry website, one can discover other poets Swensen has translated including Caroline Dubois or Sabine Macher, and Oulipo poet Michel Gringaud at the drunkenboat publication website or at Free Verse.
- Individual poems by Swensen have appeared in French translation: in the reviews “Action Poétique,” "Java," "Vacarme," "Nioque," "Action Poétique," and “Hors-Bords.”
