= Keith Waldrop =

American poet, translator and professor (1932–2023)

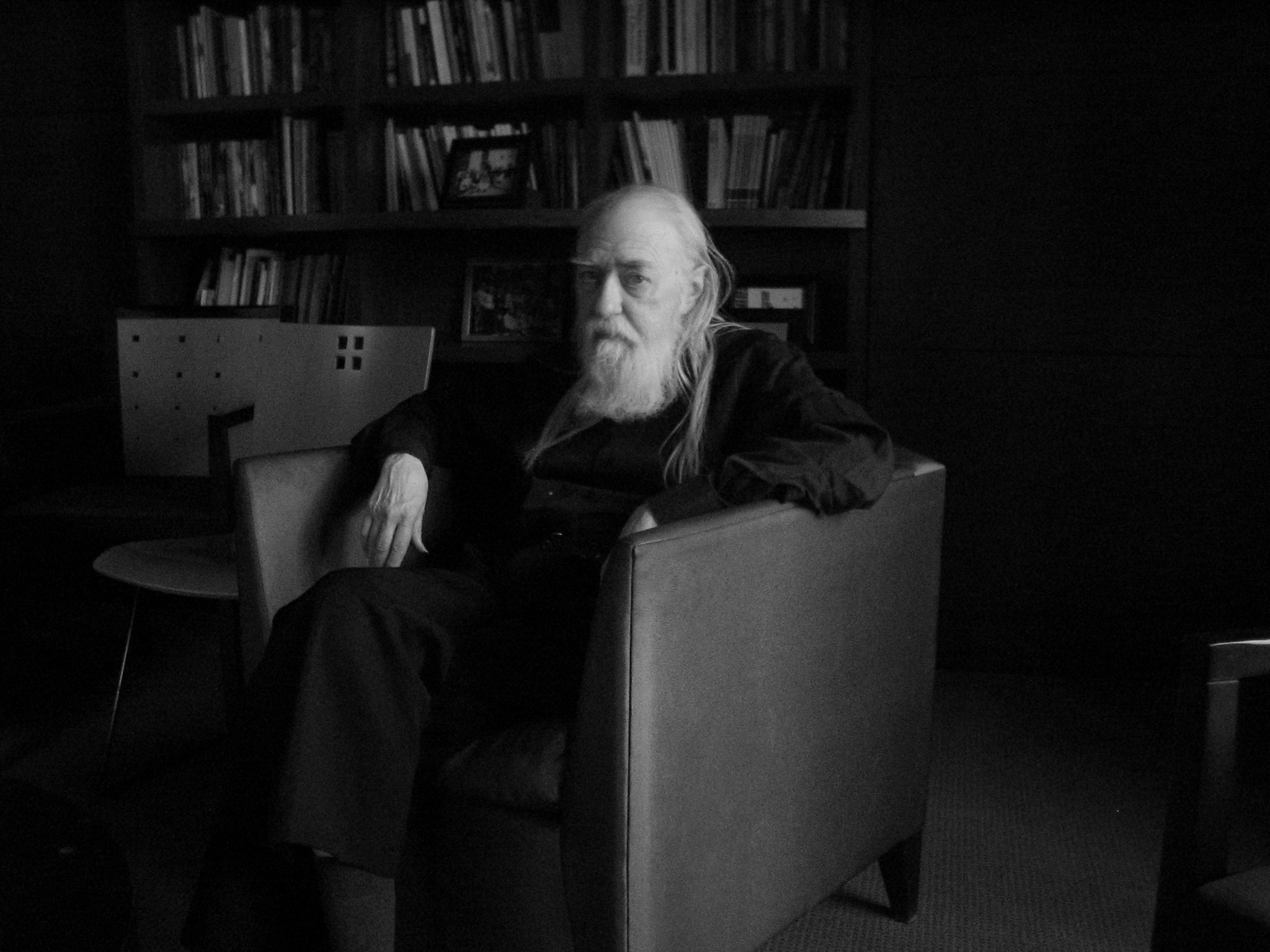
- Waldrop in 2010
- Born: Bernard Keith Waldrop; December 11, 1932; Emporia, Kansas, U.S.
- Died: July 27, 2023 (aged 90); Providence, Rhode Island, U.S.
- Education: University of Michigan
- Occupations: Poet, professor, translator
- Spouse: Rosmarie Waldrop (m. 1959)
- Writing career
- Notable awards: Chevalier des arts et des lettres, National Book Award for Poetry, Best Translated Book Award

Bernard Keith Waldrop (December 11, 1932 – July 27, 2023) was an American poet, translator, novelist, publisher, and academic. He won the National Book Award for Poetry for his 2009 collection Transcendental Studies: A Trilogy. His novel, Light While There is Light, was reissued as a New York Review of Books Classic in 2026.

== Early life and education ==
Bernard Keith Waldrop was born in Emporia, Kansas, to Arthur Waldrop, a railroad worker, and Opal (née Mohler), a piano teacher. He received his bachelor's degree from the Kansas State Teachers College (now Emporia State University) and his M.A. and Ph.D. in comparative literature from the University of Michigan (1958, 1964).

From 1953 to 1955, he served in the United States Army. He was stationed in West Germany, where he met Rosmarie Sebald. She emigrated to the United States and they were married in 1959.

== Academic career ==
From 1963 to 1964, while finishing his Ph.D., Waldrop worked as an instructor at Wayne State University, following which he was hired as a visiting assistant professor at Wesleyan University, where he taught between 1966 and 1967. He was hired as a professor of English by Brown University in 1968, where he taught for the remainder of his career for both the English and Literary Arts departments. After forty-three years of teaching he retired in 2011.

== Burning Deck Press ==
In 1961, Waldrop and his wife, Rosmarie Waldrop, founded Burning Deck, a small press specializing in the publication of experimental poetry and prose. The press was named after a line from the poem "Casabianca," by nineteenth-century poet Felicia Hemans. The poem starts:

The boy stood on the burning deck
Whence all but he had fled;
The flame that lit the battle's wreck
Shone round him o'er the dead.

== Death ==
Keith Waldrop died in Providence, Rhode Island, on July 27, 2023, at the age of 90.

== Awards and honors ==
- Chevalier des arts et des lettres by the French government.
- 2009 National Book Award for Poetry for Transcendental Studies: A Trilogy.
- 2014 Best Translated Book Award, Poetry, one of two runners-up for Four Elemental Bodies by Claude Royet-Journoud, translated from the French.

== Selected works ==
=== Dissertation ===
- Aesthetic Uses of Obscenity in Literature (University of Michigan, 1964).

=== Writings ===
- The Antichrist and Other Foundlings, Burning Deck (Providence, RI), 1970.
- Songs from the Decline of the West (song-texts), Perishable Press (Notre Dame, IN), 1970.
- (With wife, Rosmarie Waldrop) Since Volume One, Burning Deck (Providence, RI), 1975.
- (With James Camp and X.J. Kennedy) Three Tenors, One Vehicle: A Book of Songs, Open Places (Columbia, MO), 1975.
- Wind Scales (fiction), Treacle Press, 1976.
- (Editor, with Rosmarie Waldrop) A Century in Two Decades: A Burning Deck Anthology, Burning Deck (Providence, RI), 1982.
- The Quest for Mount Misery and Other Studies (fiction), Turkey Press (Isla Vista, CA), 1983.
- Hegel's Family: Serious Variations, Station Hill Press (Barrytown, NY), 1989.
- Light While There Is Light: An American History, Sun & Moon Press (Los Angeles, CA), 1993. Reissued by Dalkey Archive Press, 2013, and by NYRB Classics series in 2026.
- Locality Principle, Avec Books (Berkeley, CA), 1995.
- The Silhouette of the Bridge: Memory Stand-Ins (prose and poetry), Avec Books (Berkeley, CA), 1997.
- Analogies of Escape, Burning Deck (Providence, RI), 1997.
- (With Rosmarie Waldrop) Well Well Reality, Post-Apollo Press (Sausalito, CA), 1997.
- (Illustrator) Clark Coolidge, Bomb, Granary Books (New York, NY), 2000.
- Semiramis If I Remember: Self Portraits as Mask, Avec Books (Berkeley, CA), 2001.
- (With Rosmarie Waldrop) Ceci n'est pas Keith; and, Ceci n'est pas Rosmarie: Autobiographies, Burning Deck (Providence, RI), 2002.
- (Editor, with Rosmarie Waldrop, and Allison Bundy) One Score More: The Second 20 Years of Burning Deck, 1982-2002, Burning Deck (Providence RI), 2002.
- (Editor, with James Camp and X.J. Kennedy) Pegasus Descending: A Book of the Best Bad Verse, Burning Deck (Providence, RI), 2003.
- (With Rosmarie Waldrop) Flat with No Key, Burning Deck (Providence, RI), 2008.
- Several Gravities (prose, poetry, and artwork), edited by Robert Seydel, Siglio (Los Angeles, CA), 2009.

=== Poetry ===
- A Windmill Near Calvary, University of Michigan Press (Ann Arbor, MI), 1968.
- Poem from Memory, Treacle Press (Providence RI), 1975.
- The Garden of Effort, Burning Deck (Providence, RI), 1975.
- Windfall Losses, Pourboire Press, 1977.
- The Space of Half an Hour, Burning Deck (Providence, RI), 1983.
- The Ruins of Providence (poems and a story), Copper Beech (Providence, RI), 1983.
- A Ceremony Somewhere Else, Awede, 1984.
- The Opposite of Letting the Mind Wander: Selected Poems and a Few Songs, Lost Roads, 1990.
- Haunt: No Boundaries Proposal, Instance Press, 2000.
- The Real Subject: Queries and Conjectures of Jacob Delafon: With Sample Poems, Omnidawn (Richmond, CA), 2004.
- Transcendental Studies: A Trilogy, University of California Press (Berkeley, CA), 2009.
- Selected Poems, Omnidawn, 2016.

=== Translations ===
- Claude Royet-Journoud, Reversal, Hellcoal, 1973.
- Claude Royet-Journoud, The Notion of Obstacle, Awede, 1985.
- If There Were Anywhere But Desert: The Selected Poems of Edmond Jabes, Station Hill Press (Barrytown, NY), 1988.
- Claude Royet-Journoud, A Descriptive Method, Post-Apollo Press (Sausalito, CA), 1995.
- Dominique Fourcade, Click-Rose, Sun & Moon Press (Los Angeles, CA), 1996.
- Pascal Quignard, Sarx, 1997.
- (With Rosmarie Waldrop) Anne Marie Albiach, A Geometry, Burning Deck (Providence, RI), 1998.
- Xue Di, Heart Into Soil, Burning Deck (Providence, RI), 1998.
- Xue Di, An Ordinary Day, Alice James Books (Farmington, ME), 2002.
- Esther Tellermann, Mental Ground, Burning Deck (Providence, RI) 2002.
- Marie Borel, Close Quote, Burning Deck (Providence, RI), 2003.
- Xue Di, Another Kind of Tenderness, with Forrest Gander, Litmus (New York, NY) 2004.
- (With Rosmarie Waldrop) Jacques Roubaud, The Form of a City Changes Faster, Alas, than the Human Heart, Dalkey Archive Press (Normal, IL), 2006.
- Claude Royet-Journoud, Theory of Prepositions, Fence, 2006
- Jean Grosjean, An Earth of Time, Burning Deck (Providence, RI), 2006.
- Charles Baudelaire, The Flowers of Evil, Wesleyan University Press (Middletown, CT), 2006.
- Anne-Marie Albiach, Figured Image, Post-Apollo Press (Sausalito, CA), 2006.
- Charles Baudelaire, Paris Spleen: Little Poems in Prose, Wesleyan University Press (Middletown, CT), 2009.
