= Claude Royet-Journoud =

French poet and artist

Claude Royet-Journoud (born 8 September 1941 in Lyon, France) is a contemporary French poet and artist living in Paris as of 2010.

== Overview ==
Royet-Journoud's publications in French include his tetralogy, published between 1972 and 1997: Le Renversement, La Notion d'Obstacle, Les Objets contiennent l'infini, and Les Natures indivisibles (1972, 1978, 1983, 1997). He was also co-founder & co-editor (with Anne-Marie Albiach and Michel Couturier) of the journal Siècle à mains (1963–1970). A champion of American poetry since the 1960s, when he translated George Oppen and published John Ashbery and Louis Zukofsky, he has edited (with Emmanuel Hocquard) two anthologies of American poetry, 21+1: Poètes américains d'aujourd'hui (1986) and 49+1: nouveaux poètes américains (1991). He also edited the small journal, "Zuk", in which appeared French translations of works by American poets.

Other publications that have appeared in translation include: The Crowded Circle (tr. Keith Waldrop) (1973); Até (tr. Keith Waldrop, 1981); "The Maternal Drape" or the Resititution (tr. Charles Bernstein), 1985), and Theory of Prepositions (tr. Keith Waldrop, 2006).

Royet-Journoud's work has appeared in journals and magazines such as Acts, Conjunctions, Temblor, o-blek, New Directions, Moving Letters, Lingo, with interviews appearing in Lingo # 4 (1995), Toward a New Poetics (1994) (ed. Serge Gavronsky), and Code of Signals (ed. Michael Palmer). His work has been translated into Greek, Spanish, Italian, Portuguese, Romanian, Norwegian and Swedish.

The tetralogy mentioned above has been published in English translation by Keith Waldrop as : Reversal (1973); The Notion of Obstacle (1985), and Objects Contain the Infinite (1995). Selections of Les Natures indivisibles have appeared, in Keith Waldrop's translation, as: A Descriptive Method (1995), i.e.(1995), and The Right Wall of the Heart Effaced (1999).
