= Ritvo =

Ritvo is a surname. Notable people with the surname include:

- Edward Ross Ritvo (1930–2020), American psychiatrist
- Eva Ritvo, American television and radio personality, author, and psychiatrist
- Katherine Ritvo (born 1969), American race horse trainer
- Max Ritvo (1990–2016), American poet

== See also ==
- Ritvo Autism and Asperger Diagnostic Scale
