= John Barr =

John Barr may refer to:

- John W. Barr (1826–1907), U.S. federal judge
- John Barr (Canadian politician) (1843–1909), Canadian physician and politician
- John Barr (New Zealand politician) (1867–1930), member of the New Zealand Legislative Council
- John Barr (poet, born 1809) (1809–1889), Scottish-New Zealand poet
- John Barr (basketball) (1918–2002), American basketball player
- John Barr (shinty) (born 1982), Scottish shinty player
- John Barr (footballer, born 1885) (1885–after 1906), Scottish footballer (Grimsby Town)
- John Barr (footballer, born 1917) (1917–1977), Scottish footballer
- John Barr (librarian) (1887–1971), New Zealand librarian
- John E. Barr (1913–2010), member of the Governing Body of Jehovah's Witnesses and related offices
- John Barr (American poet) (born 1943), president of Poetry Foundation
- John Barr, a fictional character and namesake of the Jonbar hinge concept
