= Poetry Foundation =

American literary foundation

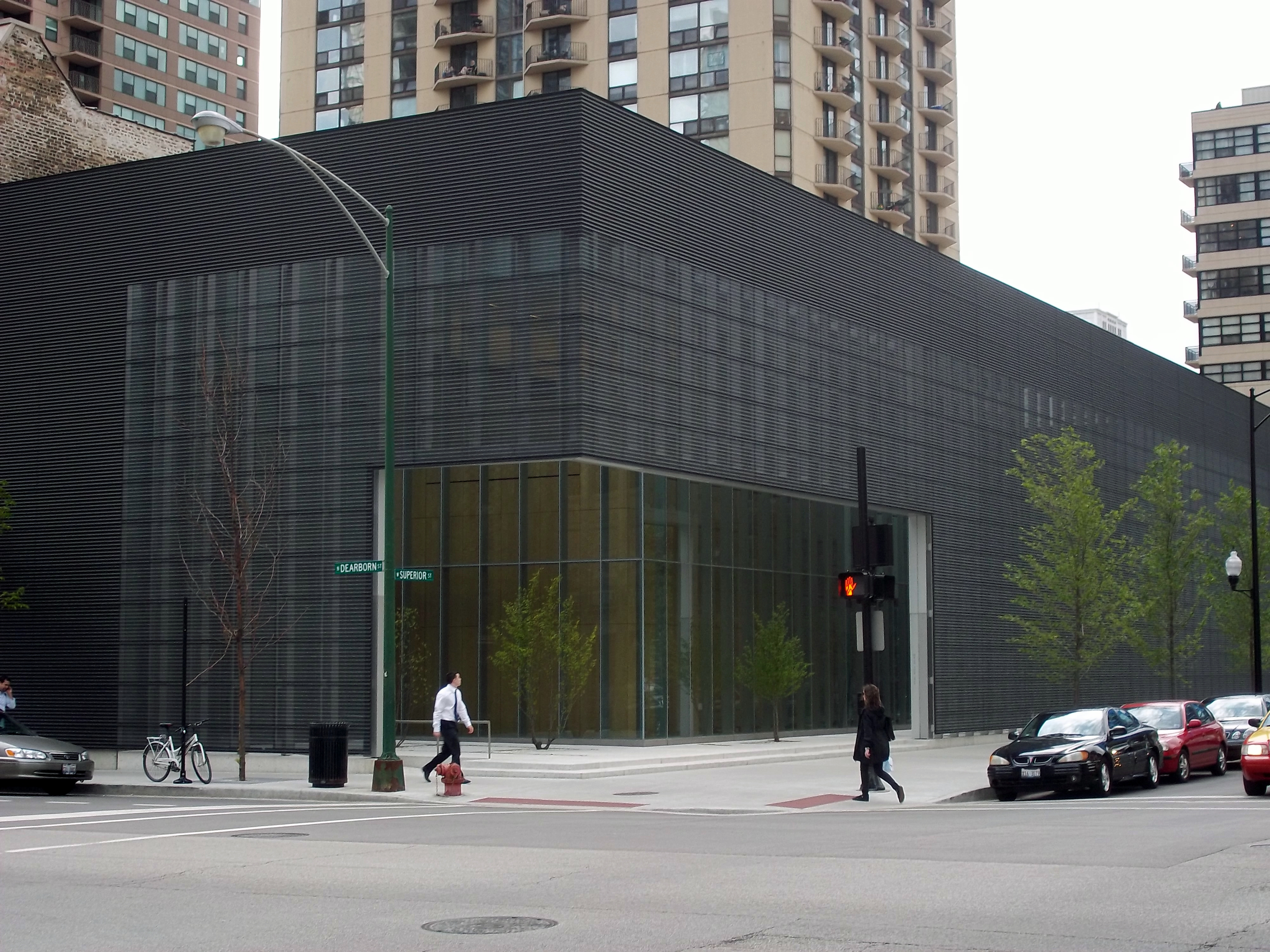
- Headquarters building in Chicago
- Founded: January 1, 2003; 23 years ago
- Type: Literary foundation
- Legal status: 501(c)(3) nonprofit; private nonoperating foundation
- Headquarters: Chicago, Illinois, U.S.
- Coordinates: 41°53′43.8″N 87°37′47.9″W
- Services: Publishing Poetry; grants; awards; public programs; library
- Chair: Gwendolyn Perry Davis
- President and CEO: Michelle Boone
- Revenue: US$13.8 million (2024)
- Expenses: US$16.7 million (2024)
- Website: poetryfoundation.org
- Formerly called: Modern Poetry Association

The Poetry Foundation is an American literary foundation based in Chicago. It was established in 2003 after philanthropist Ruth Lilly made a bequest to the Modern Poetry Association, which was founded in 1941 to support the publication of Poetry, and was the predecessor of the Poetry Foundation. Lilly's bequest later grew to about $200 million. The foundation continues to publish Poetry magazine.

According to the foundation, its mission is to amplify poetry and celebrate poets by fostering spaces for all to create, experience, and share poetry. In addition to its magazine, it pursues that mission through grants, awards, free public programs, a public poetry library, and the literary blog Harriet.

The Poetry Foundation is a 501(c)(3) exempt private nonoperating foundation.

== History ==
The Poetry Foundation is the successor to the Modern Poetry Association, the previous publisher of Poetry magazine, which was founded in 1941. Poetry itself was established in 1912 by Harriet Monroe, who served as its first editor and publisher until her death in 1936. The foundation was established in 2003 after the Modern Poetry Association received a major bequest from philanthropist Ruth Lilly.

According to Dana Goodyear in The New Yorker, Poetry learned in 2001 that it would receive Lilly's gift and spent about a year reorganizing its governing board before the bequest was publicly announced. Joseph Parisi, who had edited the magazine for two decades, initially moved to lead the new foundation and named Christian Wiman as his successor at Poetry, but resigned after a few months; the board then recruited John Barr as president.

Barr served as president until 2013, when he was succeeded by poet and critic Robert Polito, founder of the graduate writing program at The New School. In December 2015, the foundation named Henry S. Bienen, president emeritus of Northwestern University, as president.

=== 2020 leadership changes ===
In June 2020, the foundation faced criticism for its response to protests against police violence and racism following the murder of George Floyd. An open letter signed by more than 1,000 poets and supporters called for the resignation of Bienen and board chair Willard Bunn III. Both men resigned on June 10, 2020. The foundation subsequently issued a public letter committing itself to organizational change and later reported on an equity audit and related internal reforms.

=== 2021–2022 restructuring ===
In April 2021, the foundation named Michelle Boone as its next president. Later that year, the foundation announced a new grantmaking strategy that would distribute $9 million over three years and said that it had begun its first strategic-planning process since 2006. When it announced its 2022 strategic plan, the foundation said that it was changing from a private operating foundation to a private nonoperating foundation so that grantmaking could become a larger part of its work.

=== Poetry Foundation building ===
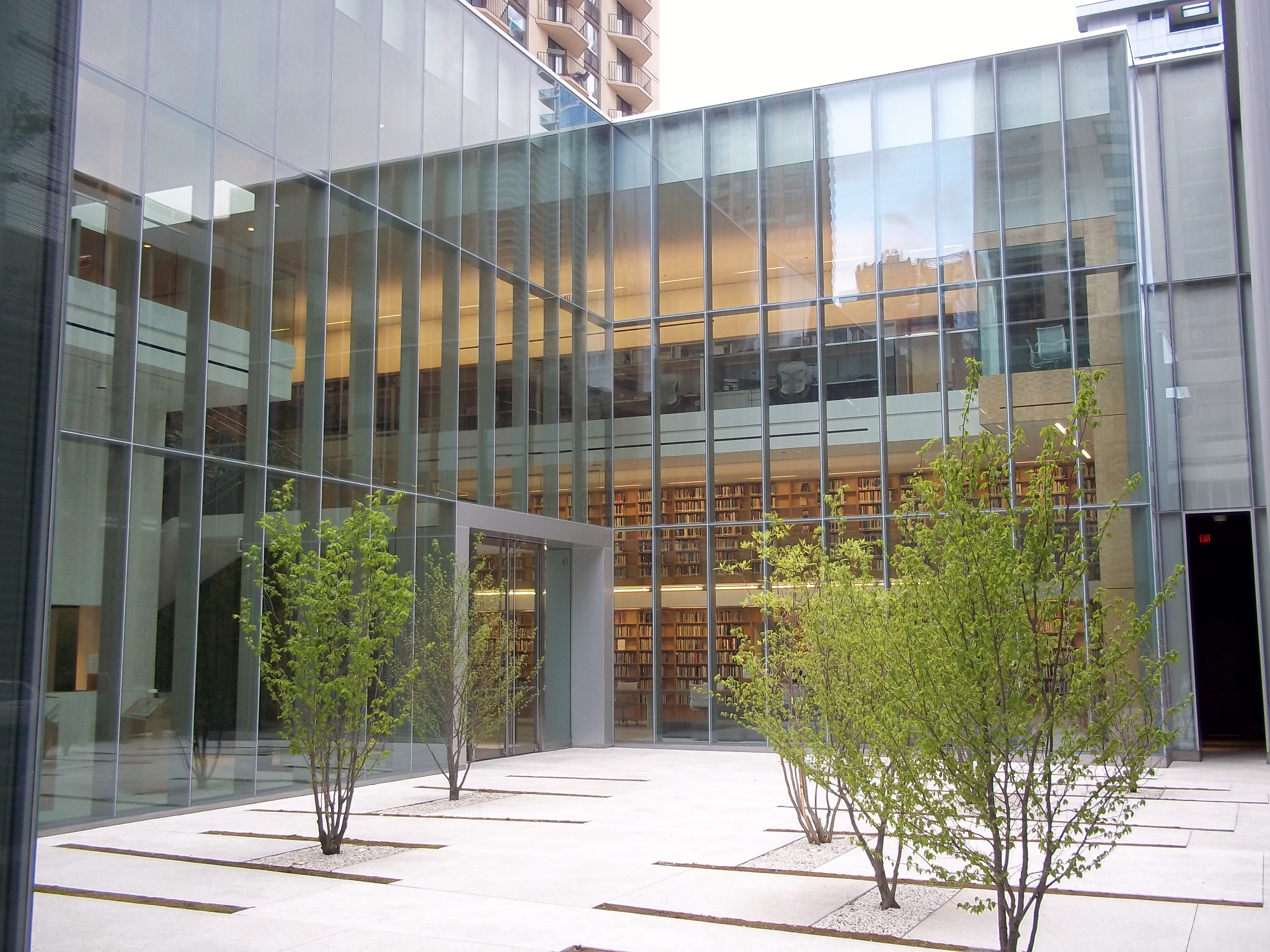
Poetry Foundation Library and courtyard

Part of the Lilly bequest was used to build the Poetry Foundation's building in Near North Side, Chicago. The building, designed by John Ronan, opened in 2011. It houses a poetry library, reading spaces, and free events open to the public, and provides office and editorial space for the Poetry Foundation and Poetry magazine staff.

== Organization and governance ==
The Poetry Foundation is a Chicago-based 501(c)(3) exempt private nonoperating foundation. It is governed by a board of trustees; as of 2026, the board was chaired by Gwendolyn Perry Davis and the foundation's president was Michelle Boone. The foundation's audited financial statements reported net assets of $312.2 million at the end of 2024.

== Programs ==
=== Grants ===
In 2022, the Poetry Foundation launched a grants program with an initial commitment of $9 million over three years to support nonprofit literary arts organizations in the United States.

=== Events ===
The Poetry Foundation presents public literary programming at its Chicago headquarters, including readings and other live events.

=== Library ===
The Poetry Foundation's Chicago headquarters includes a public poetry library and exhibition space.

=== Poetry Out Loud competition ===
The Poetry Out Loud recitation competition was created in 2005 by the Poetry Foundation and the National Endowment for the Arts. It is a national recitation program for high school students designed to build public speaking skills and knowledge of poetry through memorization and performance.

=== The Harriet Blog ===
The Poetry Foundation publishes Harriet, a literary blog about poetry and related news. The foundation introduced Harriet in 2007 as a group blog, and later described it as a space that had evolved from early long-form journals into a broader forum for poetry news, commentary, and community discussion. Among the poets who have blogged for Harriet are Christian Bök, Stephanie Burt, Wanda Coleman, Kwame Dawes, Linh Dinh, Camille Dungy, Annie Finch, Forrest Gander, Rigoberto González, Cathy Park Hong, Bhanu Kapil, Ange Mlinko, Eileen Myles, Craig Santos Perez, A. E. Stallings, Edwin Torres, and Patricia Smith.

=== Harriet Monroe Poetry Institute ===
The Harriet Monroe Poetry Institute was launched in 2008 to convene poets, scholars, and others in the literary arts for discussions about poetry and related issues.

=== Awards ===
The Poetry Foundation administers a number of awards and fellowships for poets and poetry-related work.

==== Pegasus Awards ====
The Pegasus Awards are a series of awards associated with the Poetry Foundation and Poetry magazine. The winged horse Pegasus has long been used as a symbol on Poetry magazine covers and in related branding. The awards are generally presented annually.

The title of Young People's Poet Laureate (formerly the Children's Poet Laureate) consists of a two-year appointment to an author of children's poetry, along with a $25,000 annual stipend and additional programmatic funding in support of a project that promotes poetry to young people and their families, teachers, and librarians.

The Pegasus Award for Poetry Criticism is an annual award of $10,000 that seeks to honor an outstanding book-length work of criticism published in the U.S. in the prior calendar year.

The Pegasus Award for Service in Poetry, established in 2023 and including a cash prize of $25,000, is bestowed in recognition of commitment and extraordinary work in poetry and the literary arts through administration, advocacy, education, publishing, or service.

==== Ruth Lilly Poetry Prize ====
The Ruth Lilly Poetry Prize is an annual award of $100,000 given for lifetime achievement in poetry to a living U.S. poet.

Recent recipients

| Year | Recipient(s) |
|---|---|
| 2025 | Rigoberto González |
| 2024 | Li-Young Lee |
| 2023 | Kimiko Hahn |
| 2022 | Sandra Cisneros; CA Conrad; Rita Dove; Nikki Giovanni; Juan Felipe Herrera; Angela Jackson; Haki R. Madhubuti; Sharon Olds; Sonia Sanchez; Patti Smith; Arthur Sze |
| 2021 | Patricia Smith |

Source: Poetry Foundation prize listing. In 2022, the Poetry Foundation awarded multiple Ruth Lilly Poetry Prizes in honor of the 110th anniversary of Poetry magazine.

==== Ruth Lilly and Dorothy Sargent Rosenberg Poetry Fellowships ====
The Ruth Lilly and Dorothy Sargent Rosenberg Poetry Fellowships are awarded annually to five U.S. poets between the ages of 21 and 31; each fellowship carries a $27,000 prize. The prize increased from $25,800 in 2022 to $27,000 per fellow in 2023.

Recent recipients

| Year | Fellows |
|---|---|
| 2026 | Xochi Quetzali Cartland; Fatima Jafar; Noel Munguia-Moreno; Shaina Phenix; Tariq Thompson |
| 2025 | Jada Renée Allen; DeeSoul Carson; Andres Cordoba; Maryhilda Obasiota Ibe; Aris Kian |
| 2024 | Rob Macaisa Colgate; Marissa Davis; Hermelinda Hernandez Monjaras; Chandanie Somwaru; marion eames white |
| 2023 | Bhion Achimba; Roda Avelar; Ariana Benson; Chrysanthemum; Willie Lee Kinard III |
| 2022 | Tarik Dobbs; Diamond Forde; Tariq Luthun; Troy Osaki; Alan Pelaez Lopez |
| 2021 | Bryan Byrdlong; Steven Espada Dawson; Noor Hindi; Natasha Rao; Simon Shieh |

Source: Poetry Foundation fellowship listing.

==== Pegasus Poetry Book Prize ====
In November 2025, the Poetry Foundation and Graywolf Press announced the joint Pegasus Poetry Book Prize, with the first prize to be awarded in October 2026. The prize recognizes a United States poet aged 40 or older for an unpublished first or second poetry collection, and includes $10,000 and publication by Graywolf Press; it is offered periodically rather than annually and replaces the Poetry Foundation’s former Emily Dickinson First Book Award.

== See also ==
- List of museums and cultural institutions in Chicago
