= Max Ritvo =

American poet (1990–2016)

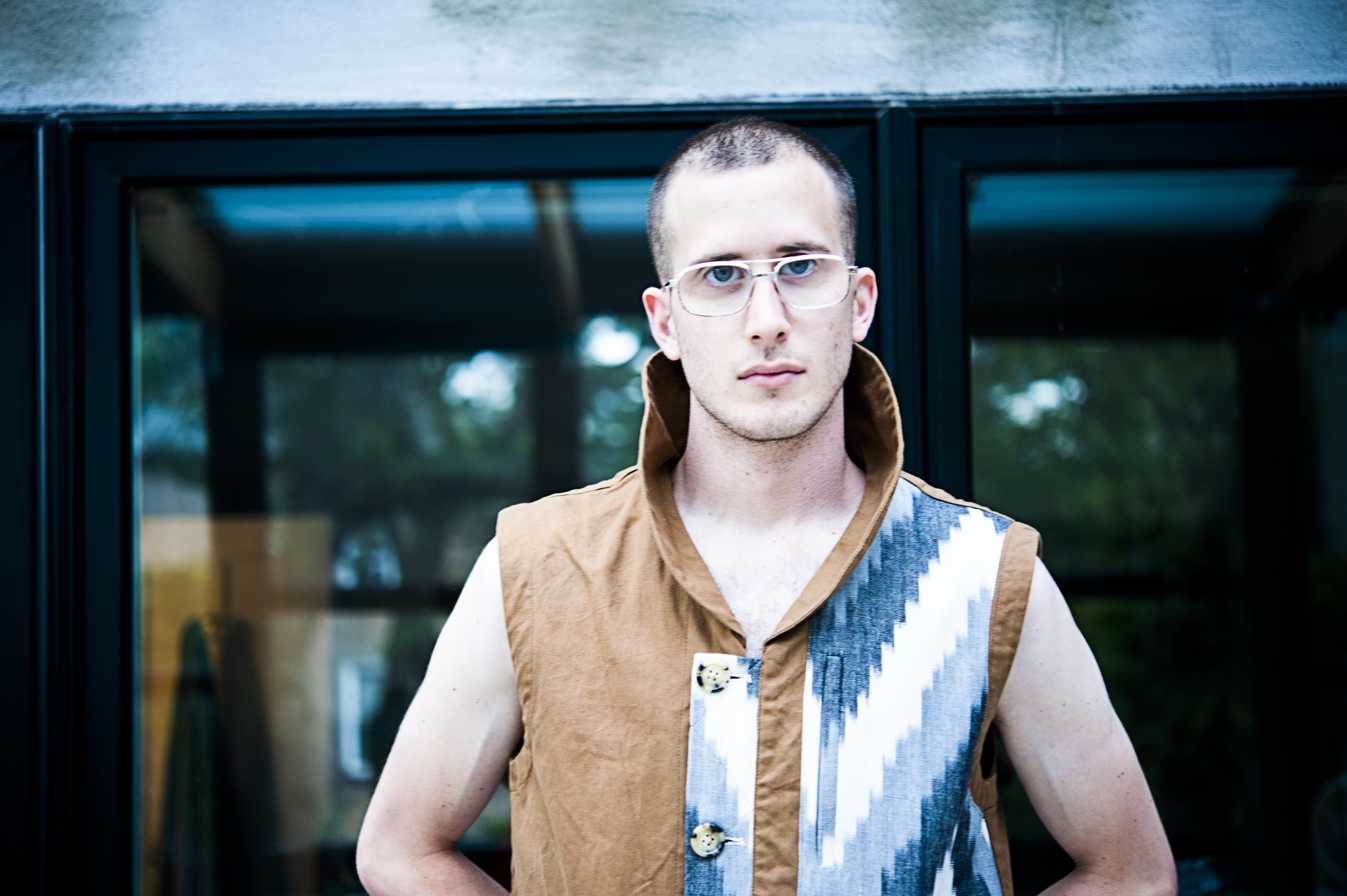
- Max Ritvo in 2014
- Born: December 19, 1990; Los Angeles, California
- Died: August 23, 2016 (aged 25); Los Angeles, California
- Education: BA, Yale University, 2013; MFA, Columbia University, 2016
- Occupation: Poet
- Spouse: Victoria J.H. Ritvo (m. 2015)
- Writing career
- Notable awards: Poetry Society of America Chapbook Fellowship, 2014
- Website: maxritvo.com

Max Ritvo (December 19, 1990 – August 23, 2016) was an American poet. Milkweed Editions posthumously published a full-length collection of his poems, Four Reincarnations, to positive critical reviews. Milkweed published Letters from Max (co-written with Sarah Ruhl) and a second collection of Ritvo's poems, The Final Voicemails, in September 2018.

== Biography ==
Max Ritvo was born in Los Angeles, California, on December 19, 1990. He began writing poetry at the age of 4. A graduate of Harvard-Westlake School in Los Angeles, Ritvo earned his BA in English from Yale University, where he studied with the poet Louise Glück, and his MFA in Poetry from Columbia University.

In 2014, he was awarded a Poetry Society of America Chapbook Fellowship for his chapbook AEONS. He edited poetry at Parnassus: Poetry in Review and was a teaching fellow at Columbia.

On August 1, 2015, he married Victoria Jackson-Hanen, a Ph.D. candidate in psychology at Princeton University. Glück officiated the ceremony.

Ritvo was diagnosed with Ewing's sarcoma at age 16 and died from the disease at his home in Los Angeles on August 23, 2016. His survivors include his wife Victoria; his father Edward Ritvo, a psychiatrist and researcher; his mother Riva Ariella Ritvo-Slifka, an autism expert and assistant clinical professor at Yale Child Study Center; and his three siblings, Victoria Black, Skye Oryx, and David Slifka. The investor and philanthropist Alan B. Slifka, who died in 2011, was his stepfather.

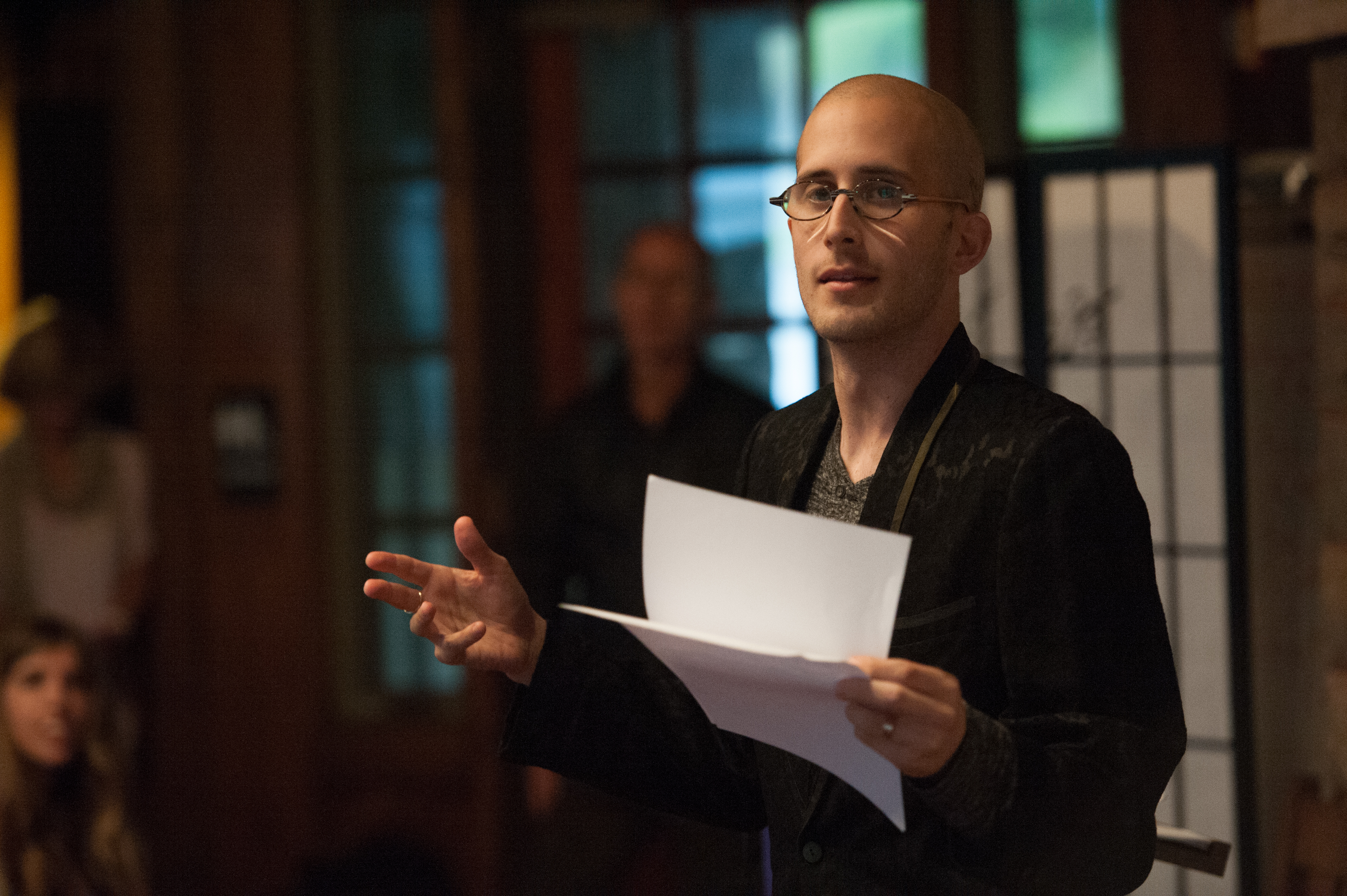
Max Ritvo in 2016

Ritvo's work has appeared in Poetry, The New Yorker, Boston Review, and as a Poem-a-day on Poets.org. He gave numerous written and radio interviews before his death.

== Critical reception ==
Four Reincarnations, a full-length collection of Ritvo's poems, was published by Milkweed Editions in September 2016.

Sarah Ruhl of The New Republic called Ritvo "a poet of uncommon grace, vision and originality" who "wrote with an incandescent mind, a fearless and playful heart, and a thrilling ear".

Literary critic Helen Vendler reviewed his work and likened him to Keats. She wrote:

Ritvo had the luck to study at Yale with Louise Glück and at Columbia with Lucie Brock-Broido, and to attract, before his death, many admirers of his ecstatic originality. Although he is inimitable, his example is there for young poets wanting to forsake simple transcriptive dailiness for the wilder country of the afflicted but dancing body and the devastated but joking mind.

David Orr, reviewing Four Reincarnations for the New York Times, wrote:

It is good-humored ("My genes are in mice, and not in the banal way / that Man’s old genes are in the Beasts"), appealingly sly ("Enoch has written / We are made in His image / but God may have many images./ He may want even more") and at times surprisingly whimsical ("Every day a chicken dies so that my mom may live").

Orr also quoted, then commented on the end of Ritvo's poem, "The Hanging Gardens":

This is very fine, and if it acquires a sheen of sentiment because of what it suggests will never emerge — that is, more poems from Ritvo — this doesn’t change the fact that a reader knowing nothing of poetry or this author might find it worth rereading. This is the life poetry leads beyond the confines of the poetic career; the life in which lines exist for what they are, not for future lines they might suggest. The life in which an early poem is also a poem, and a first book is also a book.

According to Lucie Brock-Broido of Boston Review, Ritvo is "a Realist, a gifted comic, an astronomer, a child genius, a Surrealist, a brainiac, and a purveyor of pure (and impure) joy. His work is composed, quite simply, of candor, of splendor, and of abandon." Louise Glück wrote of his first published collection that it was "one of the most original and ambitious first books in my experience... marked by intellectual bravado and verbal extravagance."

Stephanie Burt of the Los Angeles Review of Books wrote, "...the poems are equally conscious of impending death and of the next day’s life, having spent time in a pool of self-skepticism and then emerged shining, shockingly clean..." While noting that Ritvo "seems to have written most of this book with the clarity, the near equanimity, the distance from ordinary reversals and struggles, of much older poets who know that they are dying," Burt also writes, "But mortality is rarely his only subject: shyness, gratitude, and erotic attachment are as important as death itself."

== Legacy ==
In 2017, Milkweed Editions announced the Max Ritvo Poetry Prize, an annual US$10,000 award and publication contract, supported by Riva Ariella Ritvo-Slifka and the Alan B. Slifka Foundation.

In September 2017 Milkweed Editions announced a second collection of Ritvo's poems that were published in 2018, as well as a book he co-wrote with Sarah Ruhl, Letters from Max.

Ritvo's legacy at Columbia University's School of the Arts was celebrated on October 18, 2017, with the Inaugural Max Ritvo Poetry Series and scholarship, sponsored by a $US 500,000 grant from Riva Ariella Ritvo-Slifka and the Alan B. Slifka Foundation, Inc.

== Selected works ==
=== Collections ===
- AEONS. (Chapbook). Poetry Society of America. 2014.
- Four Reincarnations. Milkweed Editions. 2016.
- The Final Voicemails: Poems, edited by Louise Glück. Milkweed Editions. 2018.
- Letters from Max, co-authored by Sarah Ruhl. Milkweed Editions. 2018.

=== Selected poems ===
- Ritvo, Max. "Poem to My Litter." The New Yorker 27 June 2016.
- Ritvo, Max. "Leisure-Loving Man Suffers Untimely Death." The Iowa Review Fall 2016.
- Ritvo, Max. "Dawn of Man." Poetry Sept. 2016.
- Ritvo, Max. "The Big Loser." Poetry Sept. 2016.
