= Elliptical poetry =

Elliptical poetry or Ellipticism is a literary-critical term introduced by Frederick Pottle in The Idiom of Poetry. Pottle's ideas were expounded upon by Robert Penn Warren in his essay "Pure and Impure Poetry." The critic Stephanie Burt repurposed the term in a 1998 essay in Boston Review on Susan Wheeler, and expanded upon it in an eponymous essay in American Letters & Commentary. Since the publication of that essay, and a number of accompanying responses in the same journal, "elliptical poetry", "Ellipticism", and "elliptical poets" have entered the critical discussion of contemporary American poetry as a significant point of reference; Wheeler, in an introduction to Burt at the Poetry Society, notes "hearing, on several spooky occasions, in conferences with graduate students, 'but I want to be an elliptical poet.'"

In "Pure and Impure Poetry" (1943, Kenyon Review), Robert Penn Warren wrote, "In a recent book, The Idiom of Poetry, Frederick Pottle has discussed the question of pure poetry. He distinguishes another type of pure poetry in addition to the types already mentioned. He calls it the 'Elliptical,' and would include in it symbolist and metaphysical poetry (old and new) and some work by poets such as Collins, Blake, and Browning. He observes—without any pejorative implication, for he is a critical relativist and scarcely permits himself the luxury of evaluative judgments—that the contemporary product differs from older examples of the elliptical type in that 'the modern poet goes much farther in employing private experiences or ideas than would formerly have been thought legitimate.' To the common reader, he says, "the prime characteristic of this kind of poetry is not the nature of its imagery but its obscurity: its urgent suggestion that you add something to the poem without telling you what that something is."

The statement of the notion by Burt in the Boston Review article suggested that "Elliptical poets try to manifest a person—who speaks the poem and reflects the poet—while using all the verbal gizmos developed over the last few decades to undermine the coherence of speaking selves. They are post-avant-gardist, or post-'postmodern': they have read (most of them) Stein's heirs, and the 'language writers,' and have chosen to do otherwise. Elliptical poems shift drastically between low (or slangy) and high (or naively 'poetic') diction. Some are lists of phrases beginning 'I am an X, I am a Y.' Ellipticism's favorite established poets are Dickinson, Berryman, Ashbery, and/or Auden; Wheeler draws on all four. The poets tell almost-stories, or almost-obscured ones. They are sardonic, angered, defensively difficult, or desperate; they want to entertain as thoroughly as, but not to resemble, television."

Discussing the term later in Poetry Magazine, Tony Hoagland wrote, "Burt’s definition is quite general in order to encompass the diversity of the poetry [she] champions, but [she] gets the mania and the declarativeness right. Also the relentless dodging or obstruction of expectation."

C. D. Wright, a poet termed elliptical by Burt, states her nervousness about the label in an interview with Kent Johnson in Jacket Magazine: "Regarding the elliptical business, I’m less enthusiastic. But I do think it is a stab at authentication of poets who don’t belong to a team and whose work is reluctant to be either excluded or subsumed by one or the other, yet has sympathetic concerns to certain strains and not to others."

In a 2009 essay, also in Boston Review, Burt proposed that a poetic movement she called "The New Thing" has succeeded Ellipticism.
