= Susan Wheeler =

American poet and novelist (born 1955)

- Born: July 16, 1955 (age 71); Pittsburgh, Pennsylvania, U.S.
- Education: Bennington College (BA); University of Chicago
- Occupations: Poet, novelist, educator
- Writing career
- Notable awards: Guggenheim Fellowship (1999)

Susan Wheeler (born July 16, 1955) is an American poet, novelist and educator. She is the author of six collections of poetry, including Assorted Poems (2009) and Meme (2012), a finalist for the National Book Award for Poetry, and of the novel Record Palace (2005). She taught creative writing at Princeton University and is professor emerita. Her poems have appeared in The Best American Poetry series. Her honors include a John Simon Guggenheim Fellowship, the Witter Bynner Prize for Poetry from the American Academy of Arts and Letters, and the Norma Farber First Book Award from the Poetry Society of America.

== Early life and education ==
Wheeler was born in Pittsburgh, Pennsylvania, in 1955 and grew up in Minnesota, Connecticut and Massachusetts. She attended Bennington College in the mid-1970s, where she worked closely with the poets Alvin Feinman and Ben Belitt. She received a BA in literature from Bennington in 1977 and did graduate work in art history at the University of Chicago.

== Career ==
=== Teaching ===
Wheeler began teaching part-time at Princeton in 1999, joined the university full-time in 2008, and received tenure in 2010. She directed Princeton's Program in Creative Writing, part of the Lewis Center for the Arts, until 2015. At Princeton she taught introductory and advanced poetry courses, a fiction workshop, and two team-taught courses cross-listed with other arts. Before joining Princeton she taught in the MFA programs at New York University, Columbia University, The New School for Social Research and the Iowa Writers' Workshop. She also taught at the School of the Art Institute of Chicago, Poets in Public Service in New York City, Rutgers University, and Lynchburg College, where she was Richard H. Thornton Writer-in-Residence. She is now professor emerita at Princeton.

=== Poetry ===
Wheeler's first collection, Bag 'o' Diamonds (University of Georgia Press, 1993), received the Norma Farber First Book Award of the Poetry Society of America and was shortlisted for the Los Angeles Times Book Award. Her second, Smokes (Four Way Books, 1998), was selected by Robert Hass for the Four Way Books Prize and was a featured selection of the Poetry Book of the Month Club. Source Codes (Salt Publishing, 2001) is a project book of numbered, linked poems and collages, with references, appendices and computer source code. Ledger (University of Iowa Press, 2005) received the Iowa Poetry Prize. Her poems have appeared in eight editions of The Best American Poetry.

Assorted Poems (Farrar, Straus and Giroux, 2009) collects work from her first four books together with two poems written for exhibition catalogues. Meme was published in October 2012 by the University of Iowa Press in its Kuhl House Poets series. The book is divided into three sections: "The Maud Poems", "The Devil–or–The Introjects" and "The Split". Wheeler has said that the idiomatic expressions of her mother were a source for the first section. Meme was a finalist for the 2012 National Book Award for Poetry.

=== Fiction ===
Wheeler's novel Record Palace (Graywolf Press, 2005) is set in Chicago in the early 1980s, as Harold Washington is elected the city's first Black mayor. Its protagonist, Cindy, a young white woman from California, arrives to study art history and befriends Acie, the owner of a run-down jazz record store. Wheeler has said the novel occupied her for more than a decade.

=== Other professional activity ===
Wheeler was a judge for the 2017 Lenore Marshall Poetry Prize of the Academy of American Poets, alongside Rigoberto González and Vijay Seshadri. She is an advisory editor of The Sewanee Review.

== Critical reception ==
Reviewing Bag 'o' Diamonds in the Village Voice Literary Supplement, Albert Mobilio called the collection unfailingly adventurous. In a 1998 Boston Review review, Stephanie Burt described Smokes as a smart, frustrating and entertaining second collection with a few exceptional poems. The review is where Burt coined the term "elliptical poetry", which later became the subject of a special issue of American Letters & Commentary.

Joshua Clover, reviewing Ledger in The New York Times Book Review, wrote that Wheeler's poetry does not shy from difficulty and brings together history, painting, theology and journalism, with economics and emotion facing each other across a charged field.

Wheeler's novel drew favorable notices. Publishers Weekly called Record Palace a knotty but mesmerizing novel in which shifting narrators show off her ear for vernacular speech, and Library Journal described its prose as crisp and nuanced, with a syncopated, improvisational feel.

Ange Mlinko, reviewing Assorted Poems in Bookforum, compared its style and method to John Ashbery's late poems and noted that Wheeler's earlier work, though elliptical, rests on swinging rhythms. Michael Robbins, writing in Poetry, saw the book following the logic of capital to its endpoint and described Wheeler as a realist of a world saturated with information and consumer culture. In The Brooklyn Rail, Ben Mirov wrote that the book reads less like a selected works than a reorganization of the aims that evolved over her career, built from gradual accumulations of detail, historical fact, pop-culture references and personal observation.

Jo Ann Clark, in Boston Review, read Meme as an outgrowth of the code-based artifices of Wheeler's earlier work and observed that its chorus of voices produces a more disturbing composite "I". John Yau noted her long-standing interest in vernacular speech and observed that her poems tend not to build toward revelation or epiphany. Her work is discussed in Craig Morgan Teicher's We Begin in Gladness: How Poets Progress (2018), which reads her poem "The Debtor in the Convex Mirror" alongside Ashbery's "Self-Portrait in a Convex Mirror", and in In the Frame: Women's Ekphrastic Poetry from Marianne Moore to Susan Wheeler (2009), edited by Jane Hedley, Nick Halpern and Willard Spiegelman. It is also discussed in Jed Rasula's Syncopations: The Stress of Innovation in Contemporary American Poetry (2004).

== Awards and honors ==
Wheeler received a Vermont Council on the Arts grant in 1978, the Grolier Award for Poetry in 1987, a Fund for Poetry grant in 1990, New York Foundation for the Arts fellowships in 1993 and 1997, the Norma Farber First Book Award in 1994, a Guggenheim Fellowship in 1999, the Boston Review Poetry Award in 2003, and the Robert D. Richardson Non-Fiction Award from Denver Quarterly in 1998 and 2003. She has also received two Pushcart Prizes. She received the Roberts Foundation Prize for Poetry in 1988, and the Witter Bynner Prize for Poetry from the American Academy of Arts and Letters in 2002. Meme was a finalist for the National Book Award for Poetry in 2012. She has held residencies at Yaddo and the Helene Wurlitzer Foundation of New Mexico.

== Selected works ==
=== Poetry ===
- Bag 'o' Diamonds (University of Georgia Press, 1993)
- Smokes (Four Way Books, 1998)
- Source Codes (Salt Publishing, 2001)
- Ledger (University of Iowa Press, 2005)
- Assorted Poems (Farrar, Straus and Giroux, 2009)
- Meme (University of Iowa Press, 2012)

=== Novel ===
- Record Palace (Graywolf Press, 2005)
