= Morton Dauwen Zabel =

American academic and literary critic

- Born: 1901; Minnesota Lake, Minnesota, U.S.
- Died: April 29, 1964 (aged 62–63); Chicago, Illinois, U.S.
- Resting place: Minnesota Lake, Minnesota, U.S.
- Education: St. Thomas Military College; University of Minnesota; University of Chicago
- Occupation: Literary scholar

Morton Dauwen Zabel (1901 – April 29, 1964) was an American academic and literary critic. He was the editor-in-chief of Poetry: A Magazine of Verse from 1936 to 1937, taught at the Federal University of Rio de Janeiro from 1944 to 1946 and then the University of Chicago from 1947 to 1964. According to the Poetry Foundation, he was "an important force in mid-20th century American letters."

== Early life ==
Zabel was born in 1901 in Minnesota Lake, Minnesota. He graduated from St. Thomas Military College, where he earned a bachelor's degree. He earned a master's degree from the University of Minnesota and a Ph.D. from the University of Chicago in 1933.

== Career ==
Zabel was an associate editor of Poetry: A Magazine of Verse from 1928 to 1936, and its editor-in-chief from 1936 to 1937. He was the first professor of North American Literature at the Federal University of Rio de Janeiro from 1944 to 1946. He was a professor of English at the University of Chicago from 1947 to 1964.

Zabel authored or edited books about Henry James and Joseph Conrad. He wrote introductions in books by Joseph Conrad, Charles Dickens, Henry James, and he reviewed books and wrote essays for The New Republic, Partisan Review, The Nation, and The Southern Review. According to the Poetry Foundation, he was "an important force in mid-20th century American letters."

== Personal life, death and legacy ==
Zabel never married. He died on April 29, 1964, in Chicago. His funeral was held at the St John's Catholic Church in Minnesota Lake, where he was buried. Zabel is the namesake of the American Academy of Arts and Letters' Morton Dauwen Zabel Award.

== Selected works ==
- Zabel, Morton Dauwen (1957). Craft and Character: Texts, Method, and Vocation in Modern Fiction. London, U.K.: Gollancz. OCLC 974167125.
- Draper, Ruth; Zabel, Morton Dauwen (1960). The Art of Ruth Draper: Her Dramas and Characters; With a Memoir by M.D. Zaubel. London, U.K.: Oxford University Press. OCLC 219352375.
- Zabel, Morton Dauwen, ed. (1962). Literary Opinion in America: Essays Illustrating the Status, Methods, and Problems of Criticism in the United States in the Twentieth Century. Vol. 1. New York: Harper & Row. OCLC 1070196669.
- Zabel, Morton Dauwen (1968). Literary Opinion in America: Essays Illustrating the Status, Methods, and Problems of Criticism in the United States in the Twentieth Century. Vol. 2. Gloucester, Massachusetts: Smith. OCLC 1070601447.
