= Lucie Brock-Broido =

American writer (1956–2018)

- Born: May 22, 1956; Pittsburgh, Pennsylvania, U.S.
- Died: March 6, 2018 (aged 61); Cambridge, Massachusetts, U.S.
- Education: Johns Hopkins Writing Seminars (BA, MA); Columbia University (MFA)
- Occupations: Poet, Professor
- Writing career
- Genre: Poetry
- Notable works: A Hunger (1988); The Master Letters (1995); Trouble in Mind (2004); Soul Keeping Company (2010); Stay, Illusion (2013)
- Notable awards: Guggenheim Fellowship; National Endowment for the Arts Fellowship; National Book Award (Finalist); National Book Critics Circle Award (Finalist)
- Website: www.luciebrockbroido.com

Lucie Brock-Broido born "Lucy Brock" (May 22, 1956 – March 6, 2018) was an American poet, widely acclaimed as one of the most distinctive and influential voices of her generation. Noteworthy for her work as a teacher, Brock-Broido served as a visiting professor of creative writing at Princeton University, the Briggs-Copeland Poet in Residence and director of creative writing at Harvard University, and as professor of creative writing and director of poetry at Columbia University. Throughout her career, she mentored multiple generations of new American poets, including Tracy K. Smith, Timothy Donnelly, Kevin Young, Mary Jo Bang, Stephanie Burt, and Max Ritvo.

Brock-Broido's final collection Stay, Illusion, was published by Alfred A. Knopf in 2013 to widespread critical acclaim, and was a finalist for the National Book Award, the National Book Critics Circle Award, and The Kingsley and Kate Tufts Poetry Award. Notices of her death in The New York Times, The Los Angeles Times, and The New Yorker, praised her "brilliant nervosity," "beautifully embroidered, fanciful language," and the "formal rigor and a supernatural sensibility that placed her in the lineage of revelatory American poetic voices like Emily Dickinson and Sylvia Plath."

== Early life ==
Brock-Broido was born in Pittsburgh, Pennsylvania, on May 22, 1956. Her father David Broido was a real estate developer, and her mother Virginia "Ginger" Brock Greenwald was a theatre artist. Throughout her career, Greenwald was a prolific playwright, appeared on screen in the films of George A. Romero, served on the board of directors for the Pittsburgh Playhouse, and regularly directed plays at the City Theatre.

Throughout childhood, Brock-Broido shared her mother's love for theatre, performing in local productions of plays by Jean Genet, Bertolt Brecht, and August Strindberg. Despite initial plans to become and actress and playwright, Brock-broido would later recall in an interview with Guernica,

I stopped my love affair with theater because I had irrevocable stage fright, which I still have. What I do with my life now is manage my stage fright...

She eventually embraced poetry as an adolescent, once recalling,

I came to poetry because I felt I couldn't live properly in the real world. I was thirteen and in Algebra class. That was the day I decided I would be a poet for all time. I walked out of class and dropped out of school. That doesn't mean I became a poet, but I did have this absolute severance with one period of my life where I felt I was being made to live in the world I was brought into—Straight-A student, The Most Perfect Little Girl—that I couldn't inhabit anymore. And so I went to a place I felt I could inhabit which turned out to be, as we know about poetry, more hellish than the one I left!

It was at this time that she changed her given name of "Lucy Brock" to "Lucie Brock-Broido," as the later was "more becoming of a poet." She attended the Wightman School before matriculating in the writing seminars at Johns Hopkins University, where she studied under the poet Richard Howard and completed consecutive Bachelor of Arts and Master of Arts degrees in creative writing. In a 1995 interview with BOMB Magazine she would recall,

I remember a time in 1979 when Richard Howard, who was my teacher at Johns Hopkins, asked us all to submit a poem in order to be admitted to his graduate workshop. I gave him an eighty-something page poem called "Pornography," and he handed it back to me a week later, put his monocle on, and said, "My dear, there's not a line break in the whole 80 pages." ... But I had no concept of what a line break—no less a line—was. You spend a lifetime making up your line. Or—in every book, you reinvent the thing itself.

Brock-Broido went on to complete an MFA in poetry at Columbia University, where she studied under the poet Stanley Kunitz, who she would call "my prophet-teacher." Kunitz would later praise his former student noting, "Brock-Broido's brilliant nervosity and taste for the fantastic impel her to explore the obscure corners of the psyche and the fringes of ordinary human experience. Her poems are original, strange, often unsettling, and mostly beautiful."

== Career ==
After graduating from Columbia in 1982, Brock Broido was awarded a yearlong fellowship at the Fine Arts Work Center in Provincetown, Massachusetts. During her fellowship year, Brock-Broido lived in residency alongside fellow writers Cyrus Cassells, Alice Fulton, Cynthia Huntington, Neil McMahon, and Kate Wheeler, as she developed what would eventually become her first collection, A Hunger. She further developed the collection the following year as a Henry Hoyns Fellow at the University of Virginia.

In the mid 1980s Brock-Broido moved to Cambridge, Massachusetts, which at the time was "the epicenter of American poetry." During this period she befriended fellow poet Marie Howe, a relationship that would deeply impact the work of both women. In 1985 Brock-Broido received a National Endowment for the Arts Poetry Fellowship. Then in 1987 she received both a Massachusetts Cultural Council Artist Fellowship and Narrative Poetry Award from the New England Review.

=== A Hunger ===
In 1988, Alfred A. Knopf published Brock-Broido's debut poetry collection, A Hunger, to widespread critical acclaim. The collection explores complex themes of desire, mortality, and existential longing. Brock-Broido's work is often characterized by its dense, lyrical style, rich imagery, and emotional intensity. Her language can be intricate and somewhat opaque, blending a sense of beauty with elements of darkness. In this collection, her poems examine the body, hunger (both literal and metaphorical), and the intense desire for connection and understanding. Brock-Broido's style is known for its unique and somewhat baroque syntax, which draws from the influences of confessional poetry and symbolist aesthetics. A Hunger set the tone for her subsequent works, establishing her voice as one of mystery and intensity in contemporary American poetry. In a review for The New Yorker, Helen Vendler wrote:

Brock-Broido's talismanic words open into a magical territory of 'Domestic Mysticism'... A violently skewed portrait of the female poet and her Muse, a hyped-up version of Stevens and his interior paramour, locked in a soliloquy 'in which being there together is enough'... Something in Brock-Broido likes stealth, toxicity, wildness, neon—'perfect mean lines'... The poems lead off the page.

Cynthia Macdonald offered similar praise noting, "These poems are out of Stevens in the abundance, glitter, and seductiveness of their language, out of Browning in the authority of their inhabiting, and out of Plath in the ferocity and passion of their holding on—to feeling, to life, and to us... An astonishing first book." The collection explores complex themes of desire, mortality, and existential longing. Brock-Broido's work is often characterized by its dense, lyrical style, rich imagery, and emotional intensity. Her language can be intricate and somewhat opaque, blending a sense of beauty with elements of darkness. In this collection, her poems examine the body, hunger (both literal and metaphorical), and the intense desire for connection and understanding. Brock-Broido's style is known for its unique and somewhat baroque syntax, which draws from the influences of confessional poetry and symbolist aesthetics. A Hunger set the tone for her subsequent works, establishing her voice as one of mystery and intensity in contemporary American poetry. The collection was subsequently reprinted three times in the following six years.

Following the success of A Hunger, Brock-Broido was appointed the Briggs-Copeland Poet in Residence at Harvard University, a position she would hold for three years until being promoted to director of creative writing in 1991. During her tenure she was awarded the Harvard-Danforth Award for Distinction in Teaching, the Harvard Phi Beta Kappa Teaching Award, and The Jerome J. Shestack Prize from The American Poetry Review. In 1993 she left Harvard to join the faculty of Columbia University as a professor of creative writing and director of poetry, a position she would hold until her death in 2018.

=== The Master Letters ===
In 1995 Brock-Broido published her sophomore poetry collection The Master Letters with Alfred A. Knopf. The collection is inspired by the enigmatic "Master Letters" of Emily Dickinson, a series of unsent letters Dickinson wrote to an unknown person she called "Master". Brock-Broido's collection uses these titular letters as a springboard, creating a lush, haunting, and intensely lyrical body of work that delves into themes of unrequited love, solitude, identity, and the act of writing itself. In The Master Letters, Brock-Broido conjures a voice that echoes the mystery and intimacy of Dickinson's letters, as if speaking to an elusive "Master" of her own. Composed of intricate imagery and language, the poems are both enigmatic and surreal. Here Brock-Broido's work blurs the boundaries between speaker and subject, self and other, creating an almost atemporal sense of longing and distance. Through this stylistic approach, The Master Letters explores the tension between isolation and connection, capturing a sense of ethereal beauty and profound yearning. The "Briefly Noted" section of The New Yorker praised the collection, writing

Lucie Brock-Broido's Fifty-two poems exploring power and powerlessness, consciousness and self-consciousness the whole phrased as an homage to Emily Dickinson. Dickinson's nineteenth-century devices serve Brock-Broido as camoufläge for the post-Holocaust belief that in a time of total war social, racial, psychosexual, spintual coherence is either dishonest or impossible.

Carole Maso offered similar praise, stating "I had found her first book, A Hunger, to be a mesmerizing and riotous rhetorical celebration and could not wait to see what would follow. Over the next seven years the intriguing Master Letter poems would slowly begin to appear in various magazines. Yet nothing could prepare me for the impact of the final text. It is a rigorous and dizzying book. A book of rage and renunciations and acute praise. A book of dark concoctions, of strange, gorgeous potions: Lamb's Blood and Chant, Crave and Ruin. A Book of Swoon and Fever and Goodbye. A Book of Mysterious Elusive Universe." After the success of collection, Brock-Broido received a Guggenheim Fellowship, as well as the 1996 Witter Bynner Poetry Prize from the American Academy of Arts and Letters. The Master Letters was subsequently reprinted in 1997 due to popular demand. In 1998, Brock-Broido received her second National Endowment for the Arts Poetry Fellowship, in support of her next collection, Trouble in Mind.

=== Trouble in Mind ===
In 2004 Brock-Broido published her third collection, Trouble in Mind, with Alfred A. Knopf. In this work, Brock-Broido dives even deeper into themes of mortality, desire, mental anguish, and the fragility of human experience. Her language is dense and highly stylized, marked by haunting images and a lush, often gothic tone. This collection expands on the emotional intensity found in her previous books, exploring the intersections of beauty and suffering, and is known for its layered complexity. The poems in Trouble in Mind reflect Brock-Broido's characteristic voice, one that feels both intimate and mysterious. There is a focus on the idea of the self in isolation, with speakers who grapple with internal darkness, existential dread, and the idea of being haunted by one's own subjectivities. Brock-Broido's use of metaphor and syntax creates a dreamlike atmosphere, pulling the reader into a world where the boundary between reality and the surreal is blurred. This collection is celebrated for its inventive language and emotional depth, as Brock-Broido delves into the "trouble" of human consciousness with remarkable lyricism. The "Briefly Noted" section of The New Yorker praised the collection, writing

Brock-Broido populates her third volume of poems with such calamitous individuals as a Rontanov child awaiting the Russian Revolution and a transient who committed suicide by entering a lion's den at the National Zoo. These tragic figures exist in counterpoint to the poet's confrontation of the deaths of parents and companions.

Larissa Szporluk offered similar praise, stating "Lucie Brock-Broido's third volume of poetry marks the return of a familiar yet altered voice—a vivacious blend of childlike lamentation, love lyric, and elegy, all spurred into expression by the death of parents, entry into middle age, frustration with the postures of art, and timeless agonies of time's passage. The imperious and the infantile, clasped together throughout this five-part collection, work to create a jumpy, brooding, highly charged poetry—the same poetic "animal" we encountered in A Hunger(1988) and The Master Letters (1995), only now it is brandishing a stripe." Trouble in Mind was subsequently awarded the 2005 Massachusetts Book Award.

=== Soul Keeping Company ===
In 2010 Brock-Broido published her first "Selected Poems" entitled Soul Keeping Company with Carcanet Press.

In a review for The Scotsman, John Burnside noted

In June this year, Carcanet published Soul Keeping Company, a long overdue selection of Lucie Brock-Broido's astonishing and extraordinarily powerful work. Brock-Broido has been described as an 'elliptical' poet, which may or may not be helpful; in reviews, the word that crops up most frequently is 'gorgeous', but what matters most is that this poet, more than any other I can think of, constantly renews our sense of the possibilities of the language we use, not just in our conversations with others, but in the inner dialogues that accompany love, loss, betrayal, self-revelation and grief.

In a review for Poetry Salzburg Review 19, D.M. de Silva pointed out that "the overall impression is of a Shelleyan sensibility uttering itself, in the intense inane."

Soul Keeping Company was subsequently awarded a 2010 Poetry Book Society Special Commendation.

=== Stay, Illusion ===
In 2013 Brock-Broido published her fourth collection, Stay, Illusion, with Alfred A. Knopf. In this collection, Brock-Broido further explores previous themes of mortality, beauty, loss, and the persistence of the soul. The title itself, "Stay, Illusion," is a line from Hamlet, evoking the tension between life and death, presence and absence, reality and illusion—all central themes in the collection. Many of the poems engage with ideas of ghostliness and the ephemeral nature of existence. Her language is dense and often elliptical, encouraging readers to experience the poems more through intuition and emotion than direct interpretation. With a tone that ranges from reverent to melancholic, Stay, Illusion delves deeply into the fragility of life and the desire to hold onto beauty and meaning, even in the face of mortality. Some of the poems were first published in Poetry Salzburg Review 19 (Spring 2011). The collection has been lauded for its rich, haunting lyricism and its ability to blend the physical and the ethereal, marking a powerful conclusion to Brock-Broido's poetic legacy. In a review for The New Yorker, Dan Chiasson noted:

Brock-Broido's poems, haunted by old words and meanings, full of occult spells and curses, nearly Pre-Raphaelite in their taste for gilt and gaud, have much to say to the dead... But in Stay, Illusion the dead are disobedient in the extreme.

A diverse group of poets and critics commented on Stay, Illusion, praising the poet's "ferocity and grandeur" (Mark Doty), "gaudy wisdom" (Richard Howard), "abundance, glitter, and seductiveness" (Cynthia Macdonald), "brutally clipped sentences and brilliant timing" (Bonnie Costello), and "the most febrile imagination poetry has to offer." (Carolyn D. Wright).

== Awards and honors ==
- 1983 Grolier Poetry Prize, Grolier Poetry Bookshop, Cambridge
- 1983 Poetry Fellowship, Fine Arts Work Center, Provincetown
- 1984 Henry Hoyns Fellowship in Poetry, University of Virginia
- 1985 National Endowment for the Arts Fellowship
- 1987 New England Review Narrative Poetry Award
- 1987 Massachusetts Cultural Council Artist Fellowship
- 1988 Briggs-Copeland Lectureship, Harvard University
- 1989 Harvard-Danforth Award for Distinction in Teaching
- 1990 The Jerome J. Shestack Prize from The American Poetry Review
- 1991 Harvard Phi Beta Kappa Teaching Award
- 1996 Guggenheim Fellowship
- 1996 Witter Bynner Poetry Prize from the American Academy of Arts & Letters for The Master Letters
- 1998 National Endowment for the Arts Poetry Fellowship
- 2005 Massachusetts Book Award for Trouble in Mind
- 2010 Poetry Book Society Special Commendation for "Soul Keeping Company"
- 2013 Columbia University Presidential Teaching Award
- 2013 Finalist, National Book Award (Poetry) for Stay, Illusion
- 2013 Finalist, National Book Critics Circle Award (Poetry) for Stay, Illusion
- 2015 Finalist, The Kingsley and Kate Tufts Poetry Award for Stay, Illusion

== Bibliography ==
=== Collections ===
- —— (1988). A Hunger. New York: Alfred A. Knopf.
- —— (1995). The Master Letters. New York: Alfred A. Knopf.
- —— (2004). Trouble in Mind. New York: Alfred A. Knopf.
- —— (2010). Soul Keeping Company. Manchester: Carcanet Press.
- —— (2013). Stay, Illusion. New York: Alfred A. Knopf.

=== Poems ===
Title	Year	First published	Reprinted/collected
Noctuary	2013	Brock-Broido, Lucie (April 15, 2013). "Noctuary". The New Yorker. Vol. 89, no. 9. pp. 36–37.	

== Critical studies and reviews ==
- Chiasson, Dan (October 28, 2013). "The ghost writer: Lucie Brock-Broido's "Stay, Illusion"". The Critics. Books. The New Yorker. Vol. 89, no. 34. pp. 78–79.
