= Alan Pelaez Lopez =

Alan Pelaez Lopez (born 1993) is an AfroZapotec artist-scholar of migration, poetics, and settler colonialism, and an interdisciplinary artist that is involved in creative writing, cultural critic, and visual art.

== Early life ==
Alan Pelaez Lopez, Ph.D., was born in Mexico in 1993. They spent their early years migrating between the state of Mexico, Mexico City, and Oaxaca's Costa Chica. In 1998, at the age of five, Pelaez Lopez migrated to the United States alone as an undocumented minor. At the age of eight or nine, they stated their interest in becoming a poet heightened.

== Academic achievements ==
Later in 2010, during the DREAM Act votes, Pelaez Lopez became involved in immigrant rights work through artistic, social, and political organizing. After the DREAM Act Legislation failed in 2011, they helped organize an 11-nights and 12-day action on the steps of the Massachusetts State House to protest and provide testimony regarding immigration policies in the United States. Later, they held leadership roles with the Student Immigrant Movement and later they became involved with the Queer Undocumented Immigrant Project. Mentored by undocumented Black migrants from the Caribbean and South America as a young organizer led them to developed a feminist vision for the liberation of Black and Queer individuals. Pelaez Lopez was able to attend meetings with U.S. Senators and Representatives through community organizing and strategizing. They also protested detention centers in CA, TX, NY, and MA. They also led political education workshops in Washington DC, NY, MA, VT, CA, GA, TX, IL, PA, and CT.

In 2013, after receiving the National Youth Courage Award in New York City for their work uplifting the voices of LGBTQIA+ undocumented immigrant, Pelaez Lopez moved to Los Angeles to complete a fellowship at the UCLA Labor Center. While working there, they launched their visual storytelling project and continued working within public and digital narratives in 2014.

Alan Pelaez Lopez was also a former steering committee member and co-founder of Familia: Trans Queer Liberation Movement and the Black LGBT Migrant Project (BLMP).

After completing a PhD in Ethnic Studies from the University of California, Berkeley, they began their academic career at San Francisco State University as Assistant Professor of Race and Resistance Studies where they contributed to the renaming of the Queer Ethnic Studies program to the "Queer and Trans Ethnic Studies" program, which expanded the program to more explicitly include transgender studies.

== Poetry ==
Pelaez Lopez's first poetry collection, Intergalactic Travels: poems from a fugitive alien was published in 2020 by The Operating System, and was a finalist for the International Latino Book Award. In the collection, the author chronicles their migration via the use of poems, collages, performance documentation, and political asylum application forms to emphasize the material realities of Indigenous and Black immigrants. Their chapbook, to love and mourn in the age of displacement was published by Nomadic Press in 2020. In 2022, Pelaez Lopez was one of five recipients of a Ruth Lilly and Dorothy Sargent Rosenberg Poetry Fellowship from the Poetry Foundation alongside Tarik Dobbs, Diamond Forde, Tariq Luthun, and Troy Osaki.

== Scholarly writings ==
As a cultural critic, Pelaez Lopez wrote the foreword to Fantasy America, the exhibition catalogue to "Fantasy America," on view at The Andy Warhol Museum in 2021, which responded to Andy Warhol's 1985 photographic memoir America. They have published cultural commentary about film, music, and/or social movements in Teen Vogue, Refinery29, Splinter News, Rewire News Group, and more. Their solo exhibition "N[eg]ation" was on view at Harvard University in 2023, which further extended the artist's critiques of nationalism, race, ethnicity, and Indigeneity in Latin America and the Latin American diaspora via a series of installations.

== Latinidad is Cancelled ==
As a social practice artist, they initiated the hashtag #latinidadiscancelled on Instagram, which gained traction in 2018. Through the hashtag, Pelaez Lopez began to compose memes that sparked critical conversation about Anti-blackness and Indigenous erasure in discourse surrounding Latinx identity. Not long after, they posted a post with a red background and a simple white font stating: "Latinidad is Cancelled".

== N[EG]ATION ==
Their solo exhibition "N[eg]ation" was on view at Harvard University in 2023, which further extended the artist's critiques of nationalism, race, ethnicity, and Indigeneity in Latin America and the Latin American diaspora via a series of installations.

== Selected works ==
=== Selected poems ===
- "trans*imagination" Women’s Studies Quarterly
- "Overalls" Academy of American Poets
- "the afterlife of illegality" Poetry Magazine
- "On the occasion that i die before I’m thirty" Catapult
- "A Daily Prayer" Poetry Magazine
- "Zapotec Crossers (or, Haiku I Write Post-PTSD Nightmares) (print + online)" Poetry Magazine
- "Sick in 'america'" Vinyl Poetry and Best American Experimental Writing 2020

=== Cultural criticism ===
- "Black Latinx Actors Have Been Devalued by Hollywood. Where Do We Go From Here?" Teen Vogue
- "On 'In the Heights,' Imagination, and When Latinidad Falls Apart" Teen Vogue
- "America (n): A Creation Myth" The Andy Warhol Museum
- "Undocumented Artists Exist, But When Will We Center Their Narratives?" Medium

=== Essays ===
- "As a Black Oaxacan, I Have No Choice But to Betray Mexican Nationalism" Refinery 29
- "What Having a Second Adolescence Means as a Black Trans Migrant"Refinery 29
- "The Riot Black and Indigenous Trans People Deserve" Autostraddle
- "Lessons from an Immigrant Rights Organizer: We Are Not Our ‘Productivity’" Rewire News
- "What HIV Testing is Like When You Are Queer, Black, and Undocumented" Black Girl Dangerous
