= Henry Rago =

American poet

Henry Rago (1915–1969) was a poet, educator, and editor.

== Overview ==
Rago was editor of Poetry Magazine for 14 years from 1955-1969. He was also a Professor of Theology and Literature at the University of Chicago jointly in the Divinity School and in the New Collegiate Division. His seminars and research explored the relations between poetry and religion, among other interdisciplinary concerns. He was co-chairman of the program in the History and Philosophy of Religion in the New Collegiate Division.

He received the Quantrell Award.

He died at age 53 on May 26, 1969 in Chicago. Rago had, just that year, resigned his editorship at Poetry to take a year of lecturing and writing on a grant from the Ford Foundation to be followed by a full time position at the University of Chicago. He was at work on a book titled The Vocation of Poetry.

His poems were widely published in magazines and newspapers during his lifetime, beginning at age 16 in Poetry Magazine. His book of poems, A Sky of Late Summer, was published by Macmillan in 1963.

Stanley Kunitz wrote:

Henry Rago’s special gift permits him to strike for the absolute as an act of meditation, and yet to remain wakeful for the surprises of poetry. The best of his poems, of which “The Knowledge of Light” is representative, reach an astonishing depth of simplicity. They achieve a kind of claritas, the splendor of the true.

Hayden Carruth writes:

These are rare and beautiful poems by an exceedingly rare poet. I mean that Henry Rago, who began with a surpassing lyrical talent and a mind as quick as a fish, has stood off the blandishments of his own abilities; which is a more particular way of saying that he has resisted the temptations of poetry. His poems are natural, sure and right, without one surrender to the siren of virtuosity. Hence they have a grace and purity, which come only from true things, and a trueness, which comes only to, tempered things. In these splendid, almost unbelievable poems, Rago bring back the crystalline, Arielesque quality that poets forty years ago considered indispensable – compression without density, harmony without artifice. I find these poems continually rewarding.

Notably, he has recorded poems for the archives of the Library of Congress, the Lamont Library at Harvard, and other institutions (among the many places throughout the world where he lectured on literature and philosophy, and read his poems).

Henry Rago was married to painter Juliet Rago and had four children.
