= Zero at the Bone =

2023 book by Christian Wiman

- Author: Christian Wiman
- Publisher: Farrar, Straus and Giroux
- Publication date: December 5, 2023
- ISBN: 9780374603458

Zero at the Bone: Fifty Entries Against Despair is a 2023 book by Christian Wiman.

== Synopsis ==
Zero at the Bone is a collection of fifty short pieces of prose and poetry, all relating to questions of faith.

== Publication history ==
Zero at the Bone was published by Farrar, Straus and Giroux on December 5, 2023.

== Reception ==
The New York Times described the book as being a good introduction to Wiman's work and praised the various essays for blending narrative memoir sections with poetry. Publishers Weekly praised Wiman's prose and his examination of Christianity, describing the book as being a "gorgeous ode to the power of poetry." Booklist was also positive and praised Wiman for tackling a variety of concepts within the book, noting that the essays were about themes as diverse as religion, cancer, and animal rights. Shelf Awareness positively described the book as being "full of compassion."
