= Witter Bynner Poetry Prize =

The Witter Bynner Poetry Prize was established by the American Academy and Institute of Arts and Letters in 1980 to support the work of a young poet. It is named for poet Witter Bynner. The prize was discontinued in 2003. It is not to be confused with the Witter Bynner Prize for undergraduate excellence in poetry, administered in the 1920s by the Poetry Society of America and Palms magazine.

== Winners ==
Winners of the prize are as follows:

- 2002—Susan Wheeler
- 2001—Rachel Wetzsteon
- 2000—Dana Levin
- 1999—Brigit Pegeen Kelly
- 1998—Elizabeth Spires
- 1997—Mark Doty
- 1996—Lucie Brock-Broido
- 1995—Franz Wright
- 1994—Rosanna Warren
- 1993—Patricia Storace
- 1992—George Bradley
- 1991—Thylias Moss
- 1990—Jacqueline Osherow
- 1989—Mary Jo Salter
- 1988—Andrew Hudgins
- 1987—Antler
- 1986—C.D. Wright
- 1985—J.D. McClatchy
- 1984—Henry Taylor
- 1983—Douglas Crase
- 1982—William Heyen
- 1981—Allen Grossman
- 1980—Pamela White Hadas

== See also ==
- Witter Bynner Fellowships
- American poetry
- List of poetry awards
- List of literary awards
- List of years in poetry
- List of years in literature
