= Rachel Wetzsteon =

American poet

- Born: November 25, 1967; New York City
- Died: December 25, 2009 (aged 42); New York City
- Education: Johns Hopkins University; Columbia University
- Relatives: Ross Wetzsteon
- Writing career
- Genre: Poetry

Rachel Todd Wetzsteon (/ˈwɛtstoʊn/; November 25, 1967 – December 25, 2009) was an American poet.

== Life ==
Born in New York City, New York, the daughter of editor and critic Ross Wetzsteon, she graduated from Yale University in 1989 where she studied with Marie Borroff and John Hollander. She graduated from Johns Hopkins University with an MA, and from Columbia University with a Ph.D. She taught at Barnard College.

She lived in Manhattan and went on to teach at William Paterson University and the Unterberg Poetry Center of the Ninety-Second Street Y.

Her work appeared in many publications including The New Yorker, The Paris Review, The New Republic, The Nation, and The Village Voice. She was poetry editor of The New Republic.

Wetzsteon committed suicide on Dec. 24 or early on the 25th, 2009. Since 2010, a writing prize has been offered in her memory in the Columbia University English Department. Since 2014, the William Paterson University English Department's in-house literary journal, Map Literary, has produced The Rachel Wetzsteon Chapbook Award every two years.

== Awards ==
- 2001 Witter Bynner Poetry Prize from the American Academy of Arts and Letters
- Ingram Merrill grant
- 1993 National Poetry Series, for Other Stars

== Works ==
- "Gold Leaves"; "Five-Finger Exercise", THE CORTLAND REVIEW, ISSUE 32, June 2006
- "At the Zen Mountain Monastery", Very Like a Whale, September 7, 2006
- "Pemberley". The Nation. October 3, 2002.
- "Manhattan Triptych"; "Sakura Park", Poetry Daily

=== Poetry ===
- The Other Stars (Penguin, 1994) ISBN 978-0-14-058728-9
- Home and Away (Penguin, 1998) ISBN 978-0-14-058892-7
- Sakura Park (Persea, 2006) ISBN 978-0-89255-324-2
- Silver Roses (Persea, 2010)

=== Anthologies ===
- Mark Jarman and David Mason, eds. (1996). Rebel Angels: 25 Poets of the New Formalism. Story Line Press. ISBN 1-885266-30-8
- Gerald Costanzo and Jim Daniels, eds. (2000). American Poetry: The Next Generation. Carnegie Mellon University Press. ISBN 978-0-88748-337-0
- J. D. McClatchy, ed. (2001). "Commands for the End of Summer; Blue Octavo Haiku; And This Time I Mean It". Bright pages: Yale writers 1701-2001. Yale University Press. ISBN 978-0-300-08944-8.

=== Criticism ===
- "Some Reflections on Eliot's "Reflections on Vers Libre": on Verse and Free Verse". poets.org. Archived from the original on 2008-12-25.
- "Rachel Wetzsteon on Auden", NEWSLETTER 21, The W. H. Auden Society, February 2001
- Influential Ghosts: A Study of Auden's Sources. Routledge. 2005. ISBN 978-0-415-97546-9. (reprint CRC Press, 2007)
- "Ruskin's Whip". Parnassus. January 1, 2005. Archived from the original on October 25, 2012 – via HighBeam Research.
- "Marvellous Sapphics", Poetry Society: "Crossroads", Fall 1999

=== Editor ===
- Virginia Woolf, Night and Day (Barnes and Noble Classics, 2005)
- The Collected Poems of Emily Dickinson. Barnes and Noble Classics. 2003. ISBN 978-1-56619-030-5.
