= Edward Ross Ritvo =

American psychiatrist, autism researcher (1930–2020)

Edward Ritvo
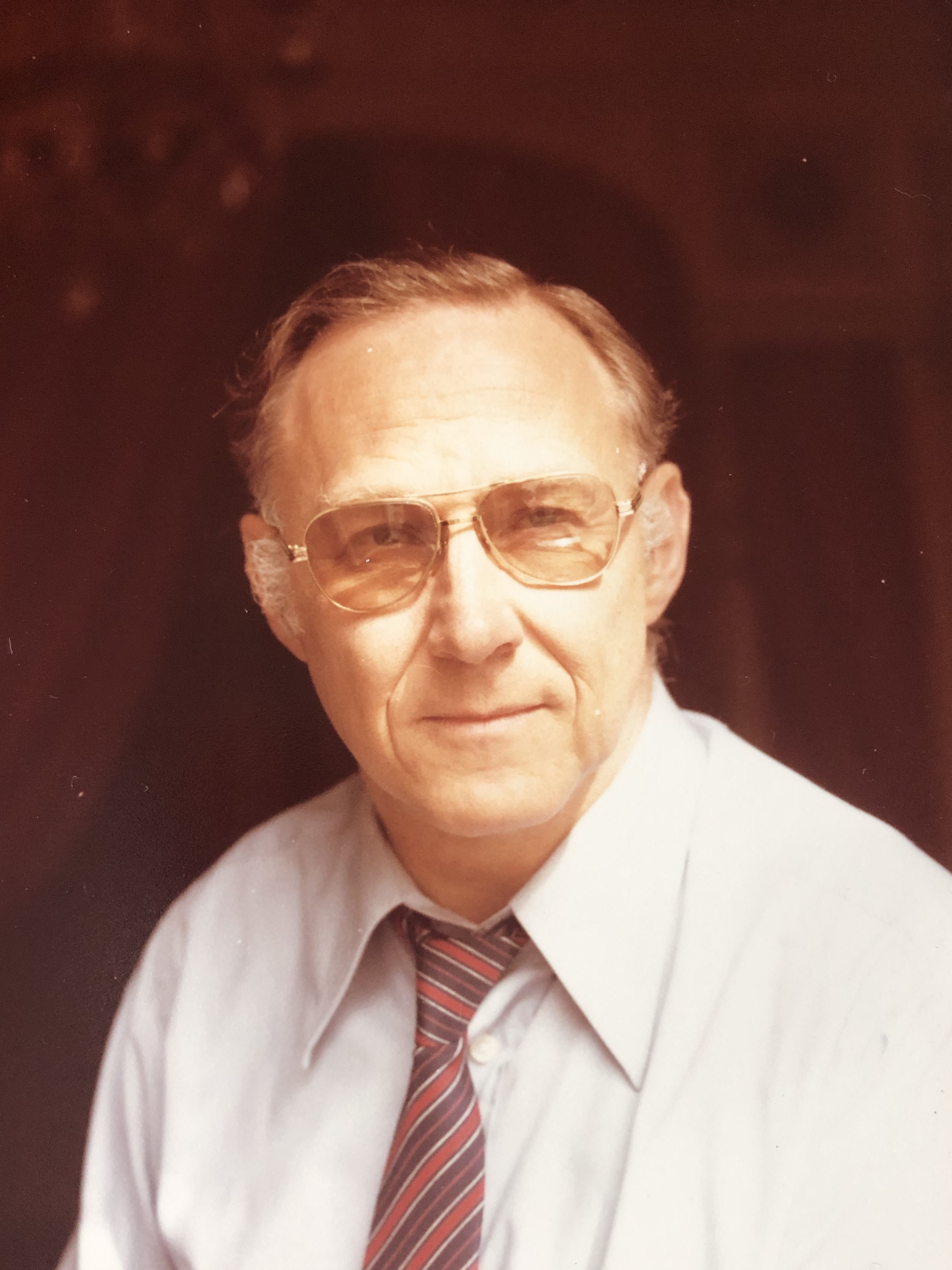
- Born: June 1, 1930
- Died: June 10, 2020 (aged 90)
- Education: Harvard University; Boston University School of Medicine
- Known for: Autism research
- Children: Seven
- Awards: Lifetime Achievement Award, International Society for Autism Research, 2010; American Academy of Child and Adolescent Psychiatry, George Tarjan Award, 1994; American Psychiatric Association, Blanche F. Ittleson Award, 1990; Southern California Psychiatric Society Achievement Award for Distinguished Research, 1988; Autism Society of America "Man of the Year" Award, 1988; The National Society of Autistic Children Annual Award for Scientific Achievement, 1974
- Scientific career
- Fields: Psychiatry

Edward Ross Ritvo (June 1, 1930 – June 10, 2020) was an American psychiatrist known for his research on genetic components of autism. He was a professor emeritus of UCLA's Neuropsychiatric Institute.

== Family life and education ==
Edward Ross Ritvo, son of Max Ritvo and Frances (née Davis) Ritvo, was born in Boston on June 1, 1930. As a young man he enjoyed rowing, skied on Harvard's ski team, and once climbed Mount Blanc. He earned a B.A. in Social Anthropology at Harvard University in 1951, an M.D. from Boston University School of Medicine in 1955, and he completed his internship at Massachusetts Memorial Hospitals in1956, as well as a psychiatry residency at Massachusetts Mental Health Center from 1956–1958. He had seven children including Eva Ritvo and Max Ritvo.

== Career ==
Ritvo held positions as a teaching fellow in psychiatry at Harvard Medical School, Tufts Medical School, and a fellowship in child psychiatry at James Jackson Putnam Children's Center in Boston.

Drafted into the U.S. Army Medical Corps, he was the Chief of the Closed Neuropsychiatric Section at the Brooke Army Medical Center in Sam Houston, Texas, from 1958–1961. He self-published his experiences there in Drafted and Shafted: Memoirs of an Army Psychiatrist.

Following a fellowship in child psychiatry at Reiss-Davis Clinic for Child Psychiatry, in Los Angeles from 1961–1962, he joined the faculty of the UCLA School of Medicine in 1962, where he served until he retired as professor emeritus.

He was one of the psychiatrists who wrote the original definition of autism for the Diagnostic and Statistical Manual of Mental Disorders.

Ritvo led a 1985 study of 61 pairs of twins which showed "that autism is associated with an inherited gene, and that the pattern of inheritance is recessive." He and colleagues at UCLA identified a subclinical form of autism in the parents of autistic children.

== Selected publications ==
=== Professional books ===
- Ritvo, Edward (1976). Autism: Diagnosis, Current Research and Management. Robert B. Luce Publishers. ISBN 978-0-88331-112-7.
- Ritvo, Edward R.; Freeman, Betty Jo; Ornitz, Edward M.; Tanguay, Peter E., eds. (1976). Autism–diagnosis, current research, and management, Conference proceedings. Los Angeles: New York : Spectrum Publications; New York; London : Distributed by Wiley. ISBN 978-0-470-15039-9.
- Ritvo, Edward (2006). Understanding the Nature of Autism and Asperger's Disorder: Forty Years of Clinical Practice and Pioneering Research. Jessica Kingsley Publishers. ISBN 978-1-84310-814-6.

=== Journal articles ===
- Ritvo, Edward R.; Ornitz, Edward M.; Walter, Richard D. (December 1, 1967). "Clinical Application of the Auditory Averaged Evoked Response at Sleep Onset in the Diagnosis of Deafness". Pediatrics. 40 (6): 1003–1008. doi:10.1542/peds.40.6.1003. ISSN 0031-4005. PMID 6074118. S2CID 45196558.
- Ritvo, Edward R.; Yuwiler, Arthur; Geller, Edward; Ornitz, Edward M.; Saeger, Kenneth; Plotkin, Selma (December 1, 1970). "Increased Blood Serotonin and Platelets in Early Infantile Autism". Archives of General Psychiatry. 23 (6): 566–572. doi:10.1001/archpsyc.1970.01750060086009. ISSN 0003-990X. PMID 5482649.
- Ritvo, E. R. (1977). "Biochemical studies of children with the syndromes of autism, childhood schizophrenia and related developmental disabilities: a review". Journal of Child Psychology and Psychiatry, and Allied Disciplines. 18 (4): 373–379. doi:10.1111/j.1469-7610.1977.tb00449.x. ISSN 0021-9630. PMID 914908.
- Ritvo, Edward (1978). "Normal child development: a psychoanalytic theory of personality.". In Cantwell, D.; Tanguay, P. (eds.). Clinical Child Psychiatry. New York: Spectrum.
- 1980 Freeman, B.J., and Ritvo, E.R. The Behavior Observation Scale for Autism (BOS). Invited paper. Int. J. Rehabil. Res. 3:254-346, 1980.
- Ritvo, E.R. and Ritvo, E.C. Genetic and immuno-hematologic factors in autism. Biological Psychiatry 1981, Proceedings of the Third World Congress of Biological Psychiatry held June 28–July 3, 1981, Stockholm, Sweden.
- Ritvo, Edward R.; Ritvo, Eva C.; Brothers, Anne Mason (June 1, 1982). "Genetic and immunohematologic factors in autism". Journal of Autism and Developmental Disorders. 12 (2): 109–114. doi:10.1007/BF01531303. ISSN 1573-3432. PMID 7174604. S2CID 21256544.
- Freeman, B.J., Ritvo, E.R., Yokota, A. Pingree, C. Mason-Brothers, A., Mo., A., Jenson W.P., Peterson, B. McMahan, W. Autism, Forme Fruste: Psychometric assessments of first-degree relatives. In C. Shagass, et al. (Eds.), Biological Psychiatry 1985, New York: Elsevier Science Publishing Co., Inc. 1986.
- Ritvo, E. R.; Freeman, B. J.; Scheibel, A. B.; Duong, T.; Robinson, H.; Guthrie, D.; Ritvo, A. (1986). "Lower Purkinje cell counts in the cerebella of four autistic subjects: initial findings of the UCLA-NSAC Autopsy Research Report". The American Journal of Psychiatry. 143 (7): 862–866. doi:10.1176/ajp.143.7.862. ISSN 0002-953X. PMID 3717426.
- Realmuto, GM; Jensen, J; Klykylo, W; Piggott, L; Stubbs, G; Yuwiler, A; Geller, E; Freeman, BJ; Ritvo, E (November 30, 1986). "Untoward effects of fenfluramine in autistic children". Journal of Clinical Psychopharmacology. 6 (6): 350–355. doi:10.1097/00004714-198612000-00005. PMID 3543069. S2CID 21913080.
- Ritvo, E. R.; Freeman, B. J.; Yuwiler, A.; Geller, E.; Schroth, P.; Yokota, A.; Mason-Brothers, A.; August, G. J.; Klykylo, W.; Leventhal, B. (July 9, 1986). "Fenfluramine treatment of autism: UCLA collaborative study of 81 patients at nine medical centers". Psychopharmacology Bulletin. 22 (1): 133–140. ISSN 0048-5764. PMID 3726059.
- Ritvo, Edward R.; Creel, Donald; Realmoto, George; Crandall, Alan S.; Freeman, B.J.; Bateman, Bronwyn; Barr, Robert; Pingree, Carmen; Coleman, Mary; Purple, Richard (February 1988). "Electroretinograms in autism: a pilot stud of b-wave amplitudes". American Journal of Psychiatry. 145 (2): 229–232. doi:10.1176/ajp.145.2.229. PMID 3341467.
- Ritvo., E.; Jorde, L.B.; Mason-Brothers, A.; Freeman, B.J.; Pingree, C.; Jones, M.B.; McMahon, W.M.; Peterson, W.R.; Mo, A. (1989). "The UCLA-University of Utah epidemiologic survey of autism: Recurrence risk estimates and genetic counseling". American Journal of Psychiatry. 146 (8): 1032–2036. doi:10.1176/ajp.146.8.1032. PMID 2750975.
- Ritvo, Edward R.; Ritvo, Ria; Freeman, B. J.; Mason-Brothers, Anne (March 1, 1994). "Clinical characteristics of mild autism in adults". Comprehensive Psychiatry. 35 (2): 149–156. doi:10.1016/0010-440X(94)90061-L. ISSN 0010-440X. PMID 8187480.
- Andersen, Lisa M.J.; Naswall, Katharina; Manouilenko, Irina; Nylander, Lena; Johan Edgar, Johan; Ritvo, Riva Ariella; Ritvo, Edward; Bejerot, Susanne (2011). "The Swedish Version of the Ritvo Autism and Asperger Diagnostic Scale: Revised (RAADS-R). A Validation Study of a Rating Scale for Adults". Journal of Autism and Developmental Disorders. 41 (12): 1635–1645. doi:10.1007/s10803-011-1191-3. PMC 3217140. PMID 21327833.
- Ritvo, Riva Ariella; Ritvo, Edward R.; Guthrie, Donald; Ritvo, Max J.; Hufnagel, Demetra H.; McMahon, William; Tonge, Bruce; Mataix-Cols, David; Jassi, Amita; Attwood, Tony; Eloff, Johann (August 1, 2011). "The Ritvo Autism Asperger Diagnostic Scale-Revised (RAADS-R): A Scale to Assist the Diagnosis of Autism Spectrum Disorder in Adults: An International Validation Study". Journal of Autism and Developmental Disorders. 41 (8): 1076–1089. doi:10.1007/s10803-010-1133-5. ISSN 1573-3432. PMC 3134766. PMID 21086033.
- Bilder, Deborah; Botts, Elizabeth L.; Smith, Ken R.; Pimentel, Richard; Farley, Megan; Viskochil, Joseph; McMahon, William M.; Block, Heidi; Ritvo, Edward; Ritvo, Riva-Ariella; Coon, Hilary (May 1, 2013). "Excess Mortality and Causes of Death in Autism Spectrum Disorders: A Follow up of the 1980s Utah/UCLA Autism Epidemiologic Study". Journal of Autism and Developmental Disorders. 43 (5): 1196–1204. doi:10.1007/s10803-012-1664-z. ISSN 1573-3432. PMC 4814267. PMID 23008058.
- Constable, Paul A.; Ritvo, Edward R.; Ritvo, Ariella R.; Lee, Irene O.; McNair, Morgan L.; Stahl, Dylan; Sowden, Jane; Quinn, Stephen; Skuse, David H.; Thompson, Dorothy A.; McPartland, James C. (February 7, 2020). "Light-Adapted Electroretinogram Differences in Autism Spectrum Disorder". Journal of Autism and Developmental Disorders. 50 (8): 2874–2885. doi:10.1007/s10803-020-04396-5. ISSN 1573-3432. PMID 32034650. S2CID 211063581.

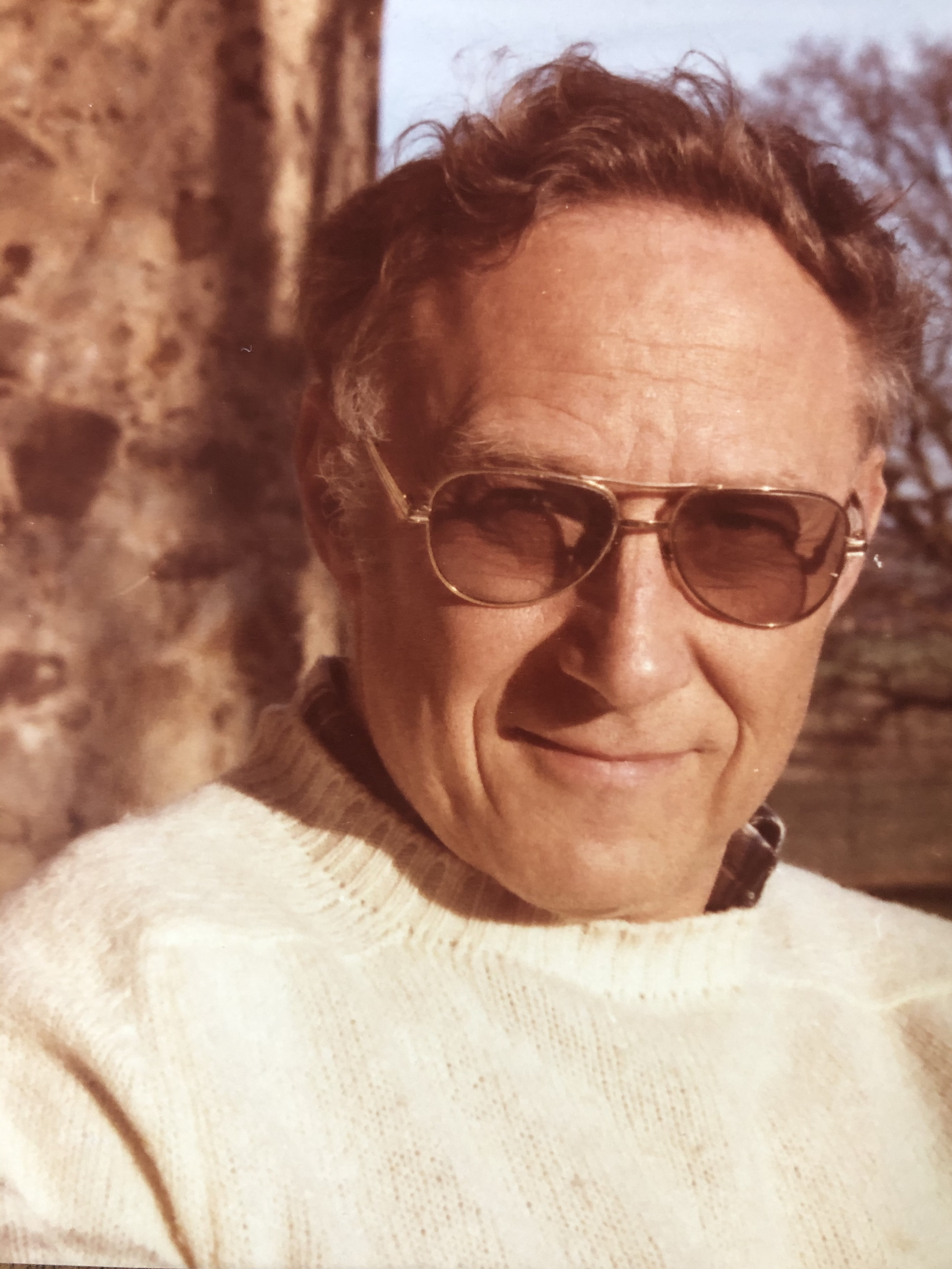
Ed Ritvo enjoying the outdoors

== Popular media ==
- Ritvo, Edward (September 5, 1997). "Casting light on shadow syndromes". The Los Angeles Times. pp. B9.
- Ritvo, Edward (1982). Every Woman Can. Grosset & Dunlap. ISBN 978-0448160627.
- Katzo, Illana; Ritvo, Edward (1993). Joey and Sam: "A Heartwarming Storybook About Autism, a Family, and a Brother's Love". Franz Borowitz (Illustrator). Real Life Story Books. ISBN 978-1882388004.
- Ritvo, Edward R. (2013). Sleep Time Stories: The Adventures of Pee Wee (Volume 1). Ngozi Ukazu (Illustrator). CreateSpace Independent Publishing Platform. ISBN 978-1490332079.

== Awards ==
- Lifetime Achievement Award, International Society for Autism Research, 2010, "acknowledges an individual who has made significant fundamental contributions to research on autism spectrum disorders that have had a lasting impact on the field."
- American Academy of Child and Adolescent Psychiatry, George Tarjan Award, 1994, for a life-time of contributions to the understanding of MR and Developmental Disabilities.
- American Psychiatric Association, Blanche F. Ittleson Award, 1990, in recognition of scientific contributions to child psychiatry.
- Southern California Psychiatric Society Achievement Award for Distinguished Research, April 23, 1988.
- Autism Society of America "Man of the Year" Award, March 6, 1988.
- The National Society of Autistic Children Annual Award for Scientific Achievement, June 28, 1974.

== See also ==
- Asperger syndrome
- Autism spectrum
- Autism spectrum disorders in the media
