= Christian Wiman =

American poet and editor (born 1966)

Christian Wiman (born August 31, 1966) is an American poet, translator and editor.

== Biography ==
Raised in the small West Texas town of Snyder, he graduated from Washington and Lee University and has taught at Northwestern University, Stanford University, Lynchburg College, and the Prague School of Economics. In 2003, he became editor of the oldest American magazine of verse, Poetry, a role he stepped down from in June 2013. Wiman is now on the faculty of Yale University, where he teaches courses on Religion and Literature at Yale Divinity School and the Yale Institute of Sacred Music.

His first book of poetry, The Long Home (Story Line Press, 1997) and reprinted by Copper Canyon Press (2007), won the Nicholas Roerich Prize. His 2010 book, Every Riven Thing (Farrar, Straus and Giroux, 2010), was chosen by poet and critic Dan Chiasson as one of the best poetry books of 2010. His book Ambition and Survival: Becoming a Poet (Copper Canyon Press, 2007) reviewed by The New York Times Book Review, is "a collection of personal essays and critical prose on a wide range of subjects: reading Paradise Lost in Guatemala, recalling violent episodes from the poet's youth, traveling in Africa with an eccentric father, as well as a series of penetrating essays on poets, poetry, and poetry's place in our lives. The book’s final essay discusses Wiman's diagnosis of macroglobulinemia, a rare cancer, and a clear-eyed declaration of what it means — for an artist and a person — to have faith in the face of death."

His poems, criticism, and personal essays appear widely in such magazines as The Atlantic, Harper's, The New York Times Book Review, The New Yorker and The Sewanee Review. Clive James describes Wiman's poems as being “insistent on being read aloud, in a way that so much from America is determined not to be. His rhymes and line-turnovers are all carefully placed to intensify the speech rhythms, making everything dramatic: not shoutingly so, but with a steady voice that tells an ideal story every time.”

== Literary style and influences ==
Though Wiman does at times write in free verse, a significant enough portion of his work is written with some measure of form for him to have been associated at times with movements of New Formalism. On the topic of form, Wiman wrote in an essay called “An Idea of Order”:

Many poets and critics now almost automatically distrust any work that exhibits formal coherence, stylistic finish, and closure. Occasionally they simply dismiss such work as naive or reactionary. At other times, and probably more damagingly, they either subtly devalue or patronize the work in question, praising the craftsmanship of the poems in such terms as make it clear that this is not ‘important’ poetry. The hardcore version of this argument goes something like this: because our experience of the world is chaotic and fragmented, and because we’ve lost our faith not only in those abstractions by means of which men and women of the past ordered their lives but also in language itself, it would be naïve to think that we could have such order in our art. [In this view] A poet who persists in imposing order upon our uncertainty is either unconscious, ironic, or irrelevant.

— Ambition and Survival: Becoming a Poet

Major critics and Wiman himself, however, have distinguished his work from neo-formalism. David Biespeil in American Poetry Review wrote, "if Wiman is a formalist, he's the kind who ditches the grandiose". Wiman's poetry takes its reference points from lived experience rather than from any literary tradition. Of his own taste, Wiman writes in Ambition and Survival "more and more what I want from the poetry I read is some density of experience, some sense that a whole life is being brought to bear both on and in language".

Wiman's poetry is characterized by multiple possible and intended readings, and metaphors which either are derived from an absence or space or undergo an evolution throughout the poem. One technique Wiman uses to communicate dual intended readings, is through repetition and scrupulous variation of punctuation and line-breaks. Thematic preoccupations of Wiman's poetry include the absence of God and difficulties and necessities of encountering the world whether with faith or without. Omar Sabbagh compares Wiman to Simone Weil and Jürgen Moltmann saying "Whether we call it 'affliction', 'the void', or what have you, these Christian thinkers were eminently modernist in seeing God, not as necessity, but as 'contingency'."

Wiman's poetry has been compared stylistically to Seamus Heaney and Geoffrey Hill, but in an interview on his own influences, Wiman said, "for sheer sound, though, I'd give more credit—or blame—to Basil Bunting, Lorine Niedecker, and Robert Frost".

== Awards and honors ==
- 2010: Commonwealth Prize from the English Speaking Union
- 2012: Guggenheim Fellowship
- 2014: National Book Critics Circle Award (Poetry) finalist for Once in the West
- 2014: Balcones Fiction Prize (Poetry) winner for Once in the West
- 2014: Inaugural Kempner Family Book Prize for Best Poetry, Once in the West
- 2016: Aiken Taylor Award for Modern American Poetry

== Bibliography ==
=== Poetry ===
Collections

- The Long Home (Copper Canyon Press, 1998), poetry, 96 pages, ISBN 978-1-55659-269-0
- Hard Night (Copper Canyon Press, 2005), poetry, 96 pages, ISBN 978-1-55659-220-1
- Every Riven Thing (Farrar, Straus and Giroux, 2011), poetry, 112 pages, ISBN 978-0-374-53306-9
- Once In The West (Farrar, Straus and Giroux, 2014), poetry, 128 pages, ISBN 978-0-374-53570-4
- Hammer Is The Prayer: Selected Poems (Farrar, Straus and Giroux, 2016), poetry, 224 pages, ISBN 978-0-374-53731-9
- Survival Is A Style (Farrar, Straus and Giroux, 2020), poetry, 112 pages, ISBN 978-0-374-53933-7

List of poems

Title	Year	First published	Reprinted/collected
After the ballet	2023	Wiman, Christian (July 3, 2023). "After the ballet". The New Yorker. 99 (19): 34.	

Translations

- Stolen Air: The Selected Poems of Osip Mandelstam (Ecco, 2012) ISBN 978-0-06-209942-6

Anthologies (as contributor)

- H.L. Hix, ed. (2008). New Voices: Contemporary Poetry from the United States. Irish Pages. ISBN 978-0-9544257-9-1.

=== Prose ===
- Ambition and Survival: Becoming a Poet (Copper Canyon Press, 2007)
- My Bright Abyss: Meditation of a Modern Believer (Farrar, Straus and Giroux, 2013)
- He Held Radical Light: The Art of Faith, the Faith of Art (Farrar, Straus and Giroux, 2018)
- Zero at the Bone: Fifty Entries Against Despair (Farrar, Straus & Giroux, 2023)
- White Buffalo (Harpers, 2021)

=== Essays ===
- The Tune of Things (Harper's Magazine, December 2025)

=== Critical studies and reviews of Wiman's work ===
- Kirsch, Adam (May 6, 2013). "Faith healing : a poet confronts illness and God". The Critics. Books. The New Yorker. 89 (12): 80, 81–83.
- Casey Cep, “Close to the Bone: The Poet Christian Wiman Keeps His Faith,” Life & Letters, The New Yorker, December 11, 2023
