= John Barr (American poet) =

American poet and businessman

John William Barr (born January 28, 1943) is an American poet and businessman who has written ten books of poetry. His poems have appeared in the New York Times, Poetry, and Flaunt Magazine among many periodicals, and in anthologies published by Bloodaxe Books, National Geographic, and the Anthology of Magazine Verse & Yearbook of American Poetry.

He was the inaugural President of the Poetry Foundation in Chicago, where he worked with the board to develop the Foundation's strategic plan and to build a permanent home for Poetry magazine, the first in its 100-year history. He taught in the graduate writing program of Sarah Lawrence College, was the president of the Poetry Society of America, and served on the boards the Poetry Society of America, Yaddo, and Bennington College.

In addition to his work with the Poetry Foundation, Barr spent 30 years on Wall Street as a Managing Director at Morgan Stanley and founder of three startups.

== Early life and education ==
Barr was born in Omaha, Nebraska, and raised in a township outside of Chicago. He attended Harvard College on a Navy scholarship, graduating with honors in 1965. Barr then served as a Naval officer on destroyers, participating in three tours to Vietnam. After his military service, he pursued an M.B.A. at Harvard Business School, graduating as a Baker Scholar in 1972.

== Career ==
=== Poetry ===
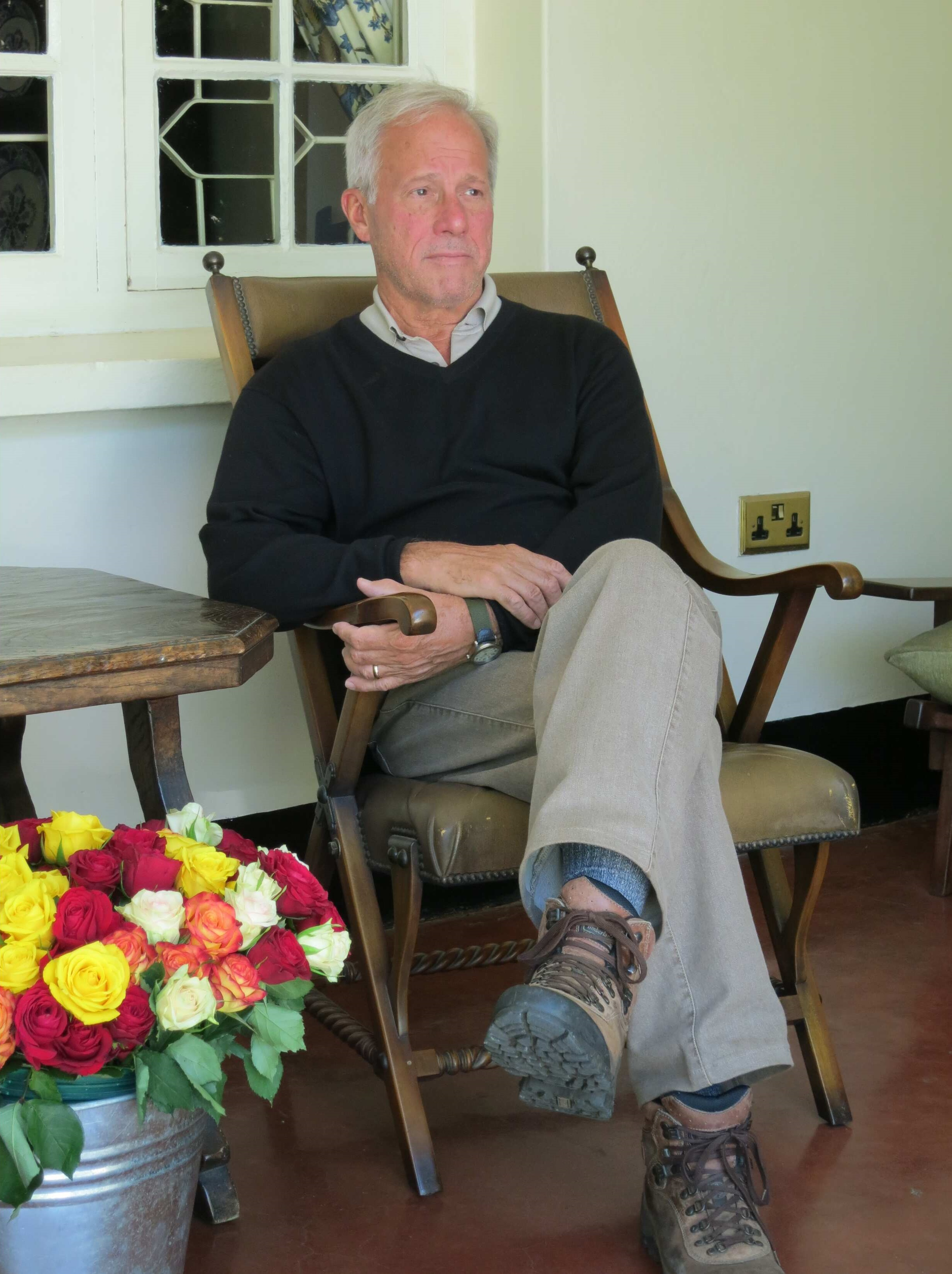
John Barr at his home in Greenwich, CT.

Barr is known for lyric and long-form poems. He has published ten poetry collections and his poems have appeared in anthologies, periodicals, and magazines. His first book, War Zone, was published in 1989. In 1997, he released The Hundred Fathom Curve, a collection of poetry that The New York Times called “deliciously thick with language and facts.”

His book The Boxer of Quirinal was longlisted for the 2024 PEN/Voelcker Award for Poetry Collection.

=== Leadership in poetry organizations ===
Barr served as the first president of the Poetry Foundation from 2004 to 2013. During his tenure, he oversaw the construction and opening of a permanent home for the Poetry Foundation and its flagship magazine, Poetry. The 22,000 square-foot building is one of the only facilities in the United States dedicated to poetry and contains more than 30,000 volumes of poetry, free and open to the public.

As president of the Poetry Foundation, Barr also tripled the circulation of Poetry magazine, launched an award-winning website, and founded Poetry Out Loud, one of the country’s most prominent arts education programs.

Barr was the president of the Poetry Society of America for 15 years. He also held leadership roles at Yaddo artists' colony and served as a Trustee for 16 years at Bennington College, including 12 years as Board Chair.

=== Business and finance ===
Barr is retired from a successful 30-year career on Wall Street. He was a Managing Director at Morgan Stanley and founded three startups, including the United States' first natural gas marketing company. He also advised on many mergers in the consolidation of the electric and gas utility industries.

== Personal life ==
Barr and his wife Penny were classmates at Lisle High School and live in Greenwich, CT. They have three children and two grandchildren.

== Publications ==
=== Poetry books ===
- The Boxer of Quirinal (2023, Red Hen Press)
- Dante in China (2018, Red Hen Press)
- The Adventures of Ibn Opcit: Opcit at Large (Volume 2) (2013, Red Hen Press)
- The Adventures of Ibn Opcit: Grace (Volume 1) (2013, Red Hen Press)
- The Hundred Fathom Curve: New & Collected Poems (2011, Red Hen Press)
- Centennial Suite (1998, Warwick Press)
- The Hundred Fathom Curve (1997, Story Line Press)
- The Dial Painters (1994, Warwick Press)
- Natural Wonders (1991, Warwick Press)
- The War Zone (1989, Warwick Press)

=== Anthologies featuring Barr's poems ===
- Power of the Feminine “I” (2023, ThreshPress)
- Staying Human: New Poems for Staying Alive (2020, Bloodaxe Books)
- The Poetry of US: More than 200 poems that celebrate the people, places, and passions of the United States (2018, National Geographic)
- National Geographic Book of Nature Poetry (2015, National Geographic)
- Anthology of Magazine Verse Yearbook of America Poetry (1988, Monitor Book Company)

=== Essays ===
- Barr, John. "American Poetry in the New Century." Poetry Magazine August 22, 2006.
- Barr, John. "Is It Poetry or Is It Verse?" The Poetry Foundation. September 17, 2006.

=== Film ===
- "The South China Sea" is a twenty-minute poetry film excerpted from the book The Boxer of Quirinal (Red Hen Press, 2023)

== Awards and honors ==
- The Boxer of Quirinal was longlisted for the 2024 PEN/Voelcker Award for Poetry Collection.
- Champion of Literacy Award, 2013, Walt Whitman Birthplace Association.
- Nominated for Connecticut Poet Laureate for term starting 2022.
