= John Barr (footballer, born 1885) =

Scottish footballer

Personal information
- Date of birth: 1885
- Place of birth: Lanark, Scotland
- Position: Winger

Senior career*
Years	Team	Apps	(Gls)
1903–1904	Motherwell		
1904–1905	Lanemark		
1905–1907	Partick Thistle		
1907	Grimsby Town	2	(1)
- * Club domestic league appearances and goals

John Barr (1885 – after 1906) was a Scottish professional footballer who played as a winger.
