= Michelle Boone =

American arts executive (born 1961)

- Born: July 17, 1961 (age 64); Chicago, Illinois, U.S.
- Education: Indiana University Bloomington
- Occupation: Arts executive
- Known for: City of Chicago Cultural Affairs Commissioner; Poetry Foundation

Michelle T. Boone (born July 17, 1961) is an American arts executive. She is the president of the Poetry Foundation and previously served as Commissioner of Cultural Affairs for the City of Chicago.
