= Eva Ritvo =

- Born: Eva Caroline Ritvo
- Occupations: Psychiatrist and Author
- Website: Official site

Eva Ritvo is an American television and radio personality, author, and psychiatrist noted for her work on women's empowerment issues and self-help books. She is the co-founder of the Bold Beauty Project and the founder of Bekindr.

In her private medical practice, she has more than a twenty-year career in treating individuals, couples, and families. She has made frequent public speaking and television appearances including NBC's TODAY Show and a special segment on EXTRA called "Beauty and the Brain". She had a long running TV segment called "Real Relationship". She has been featured in the Miami Herald, The New York Times , New York Times Magazine, The Daily News Celebrity Watch, USA Today, The Wall Street Journal, WebMD, SELF magazine, Good Housekeeping, O Magazine, Allure and others. She has been a guest on the radio show "Brain Food for the Heartland" and on numerous other radio shows. She is a host of the PBS Series TechVersify.

== Education and medical career ==
Ritvo completed her undergraduate degree from UCLA, and her M.D. from the David Geffen School of Medicine at UCLA. She completed her residency at New York Hospital Payne Whitney Clinic/ Cornell University. She is the former vice chair of the Department of Psychiatry and Behavioral Sciences at the University of Miami's Miller School of Medicine.

She is a Distinguished Fellow of the American Psychiatric Association, a member of the American College of Psychiatrists, and the International Society of Sports Psychiatry.

== Author ==
Ritvo has written and lectured extensively in the US and internationally on the science and meaning of kindness, on beauty, and on women's empowerment issues. Ritvo has written book chapters and articles on topics that include body dysmorphic disorder, managing patient expectations, and handling difficult patients. She is the co-author of the best-selling self-help book "The Beauty Prescription" (McGraw-Hill, 2008). She is the lead author of "The Concise Guide to Marriage and Family Therapy" (American Psychiatric Pub., 2002) and has written the chapters on family and couples therapy for leading psychiatric textbooks. Ritvo is the author of "Bekindr: The Transformative Power of Kindness" (Momosa Publishing, 2017,2018).

== Causes ==
At the Miller School of Medicine, Ritvo initiated the Margaret Ann Aitcheson Humanitarian Award named in honor of Tipper Gore's mother and first recipient. The award honors those who have made an outstanding contribution in the field of mental health. Ritvo is a member of the Board of United Community Options (formerly United Cerebral Palsy of South Florida). Ritvo hosts the Annual Marissa Nestor Tennis Invitational to raise funds for the organization as well as assisting in numerous other events throughout the year.
