= Stephanie Burt =

American literary critic and academic

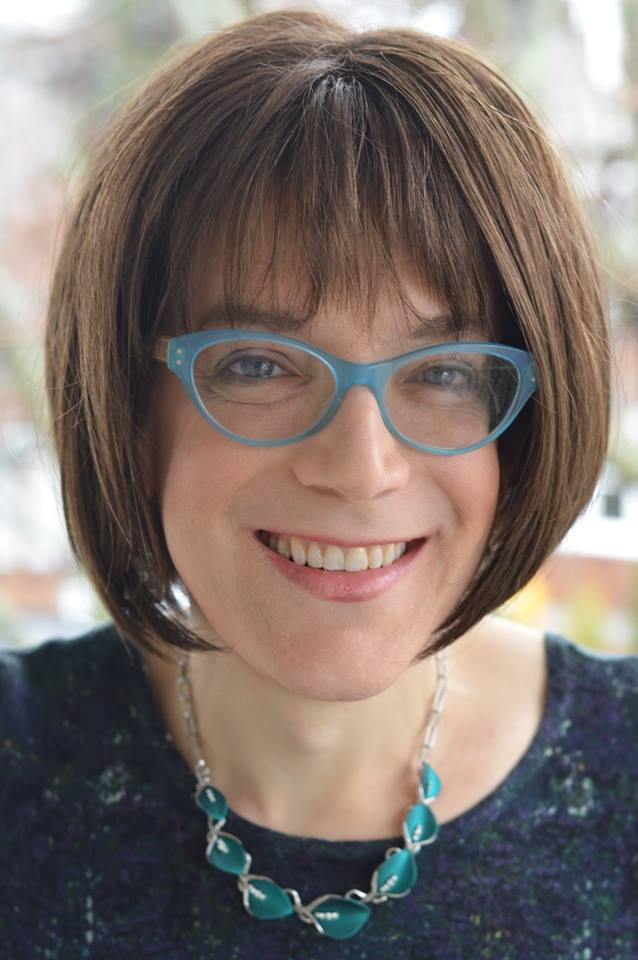
- Burt in December 2018
- Education: Georgetown Day School; Harvard University (BA); Yale University (PhD)
- Writing career
- Language: English
- Genres: Literary criticism Poetry
- Notable works: Randall Jarrell and His Age "The New Things" "Elliptical poetry"
- Title: Donald P. and Katherine B. Loker Professor of English

Academic background
- Thesis: Randall Jarrell and His Age (2000)
- Doctoral advisor: Langdon Hammer

Academic work
- Discipline: English
- Sub-discipline: Poetry
- Institutions: Macalaster College; Harvard University

Stephanie Burt (formerly published as Stephen Burt) is an American literary critic and poet who is the Donald P. and Katherine B. Loker Professor of English at Harvard University. The New York Times has called her "one of the most influential poetry critics of [her] generation." Burt grew up around Washington, D.C. She has published various collections of poetry and a large amount of literary criticism and research. Her work has appeared in The New Yorker, The New York Times Book Review, The London Review of Books, and other publications.

== Literary criticism ==
=== Elliptical poetry ===
Burt received significant attention for coining the term "Elliptical poetry" in a 1998 book review of Susan Wheeler's book Smokes in Boston Review magazine:

Elliptical poets try to manifest a person—who speaks the poem and reflects the poet—while using all the verbal gizmos developed over the last few decades to undermine the coherence of speaking selves. They are post-avant-gardist, or post-"postmodern": they have read (most of them) Stein's heirs, and the "language writers," and have chosen to do otherwise. Elliptical poems shift drastically between low (or slangy) and high (or naively "poetic") diction. Some are lists of phrases beginning "I am an X, I am a Y." Ellipticism's favorite established poets are Dickinson, Berryman, Ashbery, and/or Auden [...] The poets tell almost-stories, or almost-obscured ones. They are sardonic, angered, defensively difficult, or desperate; they want to entertain as thoroughly as, but not to resemble, television.

Burt also adds that Elliptical poets are "good at describing information overload." In addition to calling Wheeler an important Elliptical poet, she also lists Liam Rector's The Sorrow of Architecture (1984), Lucie Brock-Broido's The Master Letters (1995), Mark Ford's Landlocked (1992), and Mark Levine's Debt (1993) as "some groundbreaking and definitively Elliptical books."

=== The New Thing ===
In 2009, she wrote "The New Things", an essay in which she posits a new category of American contemporary poets which she calls "The New Thing". These poets derive their style from writers like William Carlos Williams, Robert Creeley, Gertrude Stein, and George Oppen:

The poets of the New Thing observe scenes and people (not only, but also, themselves) with a self-subordinating concision, so much so that the term "minimalism" comes up in discussions of their work [...] The poets of the New Thing eschew sarcasm and tread lightly with ironies, and when they seem hard to pin down, it is because they leave space for interpretations to fit [...] The new poetry, the new thing, seeks, as Williams did, well-made, attentive, unornamented things. It is equally at home (as he was) in portraits and still lifes, in epigram and quoted speech; and it is at home (as he was not) in articulating sometimes harsh judgments, and in casting backward looks. The new poets pursue compression, compact description, humility, restricted diction, and—despite their frequent skepticism—fidelity to a material and social world. They follow Williams’s "demand", as the critic Douglas Mao put it, "both that poetry be faithful to the thing represented and that it be a thing in itself." They are so bound up with ideas of durable thinghood that we can name the tendency simply by capitalizing: the New Thing [...] Reference, brevity, self-restraint, attention outside the self, material objects as models, Williams and his heirs as predecessors, classical lyric and epigram as precedents: all these, together, constitute the New Thing.

Poets whom she cites as examples of The New Thing include Rae Armantrout, Michael O'Brien, Justin Marks, Elizabeth Treadwell, and Graham Foust.

=== Other writings ===
In addition to her essays for the Boston Review, Burt has written for The New Yorker, The New York Times Book Review, The Poetry Review, Slate, The Times Literary Supplement, the London Review of Books, and the Yale Review.

She has an interest in the work of the writer Randall Jarrell, and Burt's book Randall Jarrell and His Age reevaluates Jarrell's importance as a poet. The book won the Warren–Brooks Award in 2002. In explaining her book's aim, Burt wrote: "Many readers know Jarrell as the author of several anthology poems [...] a charming book or two for children, and a panoply of influential reviews. This book aims to illuminate a Jarrell more ambitious, more complex, and more important than that." In 2005, she also edited Randall Jarrell on W. H. Auden, a collection of Jarrell's critical essays, with Hannah Brooks-Motl.

She sometimes writes for a popular audience for Slate and The New Yorker, including an article about X-Men: Days of Future Past in the voice of Kitty Pryde.

== Career ==
Burt earned an AB from Harvard University in 1994 and a PhD from Yale University in 2000 before joining the faculty at Macalester College from 2000 to 2007. Since 2007, she has worked at Harvard University, where she became a tenured professor in 2010. In 2023, she was named the Donald P. and Katherine B. Loker Professor of English.

In July 2022, Burt began an actual play podcast with Fiona Hopkins named Team-Up Moves. On it, they play various superhero-based role-playing games and have 13 episodes across 2 seasons; the show has been on hiatus since August 2023.

In the Spring 2024 semester, Burt taught a course at Harvard University called "Taylor Swift and Her World", an English course about the musical works of American singer-songwriter Taylor Swift. The course was met with widespread enthusiasm, enrolling almost 200 Harvard College undergraduate students. In October 2025, she published a book based on the course, Taylor's Version: The Poetic and Musical Genius of Taylor Swift.

Burt has published four books of her own poetry, Popular Music (1999), which won the Colorado Prize for Poetry, Parallel Play (2006), Belmont (2013), Advice From The Lights (2017), and We are Mermaids (2022).

== Personal life ==
Burt is a trans woman and uses she/her and they/them pronouns. She has been active in LGBTQ rights campaigns.

== Bibliography ==
=== Poetry ===
Collections

- Burt, Stephanie (1999). Popular music. Fort Collins: Center for Literary Publishing/University Press of Colorado.
- — (2006). Parallel play. Minneapolis: Graywolf Press.
- — (2013). Belmont. Minneapolis: Graywolf Press.
- — (2017). Advice from the lights : poems. Minneapolis: Graywolf Press.
- — (2020). After Callimachus : poems. Princeton University Press.
- — (2021). For all mutants. Rain Taxi.
- — (2022). We Are Mermaids: Poems. Minneapolis: Graywolf Press.

List of poems

Title	Year	First published	Reprinted/collected
Hermit crab	2013	"Hermit crab". The New Yorker. 89 (23). August 5, 2013.	
Ice for the ice trade	2015	"Ice for the ice trade". The New Yorker. 91 (37). November 23, 2015.	

=== Literary criticism ===
- Randall Jarrell and His Age (Columbia University Press, 2002)
- Randall Jarrell on W.H. Auden (Columbia University Press, 2005)
- The Forms of Youth: Twentieth-Century Poetry and Adolescence (Columbia University Press, 2007)
- Close Calls with Nonsense: Reading New Poetry (Graywolf Press, 2009)
- The Art of the Sonnet (Harvard University Press, 2010, co-authored with David Mikics) ISBN 978-0674061804
- "Chris Van Hollen". The Believer. 11 (3). March–April 2013.
- From There: Some Thoughts on Poetry & Place (Ronsdale Press, 2016) ISBN 978-1553804611
- The Poem Is You: 60 Contemporary American Poems and How to Read Them (Harvard University Press, 2016) ISBN 978-0674737877
- "Run-of-the-mill sticks, run-of-the mill stakes". Symposium. The Believer. 14 (3). December 2017 – January 2018.
- Don't Read Poetry: A Book About How to Read Poems (Basic Books, 2019)
- "Flame on: we all live in Stan Lee's universe. How much of it did he create?". The New Yorker. 97 (1). February 15–22, 2021. (Note: Online version is titled "Who really created the Marvel universe?".)

———————

Bibliography notes
