= Poetry (magazine) =

American poetry magazine founded in 1912

- September 2024 cover
- Editor-in-chief: Adrian Matejka
- Former editors: Harriet Monroe (1912–1936) Morton Dauwen Zabel (1936–1937); George Dillon (1937–1942); Group editorship (1942–1949); Hayden Carruth (1949–1950); Karl Shapiro (1950–1955); Henry Rago (1955–1969); Daryl Hine (1969–1977); John Frederick Nims (1978–1983); Joseph Parisi (1983–2003); Christian Wiman (2003–2013); Don Share (2013–2020) Guest editors (2021–2022): Esther Belin, Su Cho, Suzi F. Garcia, Ashley M. Jones, Srikanth "Chicu" Reddy
- Categories: Poetry
- Frequency: Ten issues annually
- Circulation: 30,000
- Founder: Harriet Monroe
- First issue: October 1912; 113 years ago
- Company: Poetry Foundation
- Country: United States
- Based in: Chicago, Illinois, U.S.
- Language: English
- Website: Poetry Magazine
- ISSN: 0032-2032

Poetry is an American poetry magazine founded in Chicago in 1912 by Harriet Monroe. Originally titled Poetry: A Magazine of Verse, it is published by the Poetry Foundation. The magazine publishes ten print issues annually and also publishes poetry, prose, translations, and archival material online.

Poetry became one of the most influential English-language poetry magazines of the twentieth century. Encyclopædia Britannica states that, during Monroe's editorship, it "quickly became the world's leading English-language poetry journal" and describes it as "the principal organ for modern poetry of the English-speaking world". Its early issues published work by poets including T. S. Eliot, H.D., Ezra Pound, Robert Frost, Marianne Moore, Langston Hughes, and Rabindranath Tagore. Archival records for the magazine are held by research libraries including the University of Chicago Library and Indiana University's Lilly Library.

In 2002, Ruth Lilly, an heir to the Eli Lilly pharmaceutical fortune and a longtime patron of poetry, gave $100 million to the Modern Poetry Association, the magazine's publisher. The Poetry Foundation was established the following year, and the gift was later reported as worth approximately $200 million. Since 2022, Poetry has been edited by Adrian Matejka, the first Black editor to lead the magazine.

== History ==
=== Founding and editorial policy ===
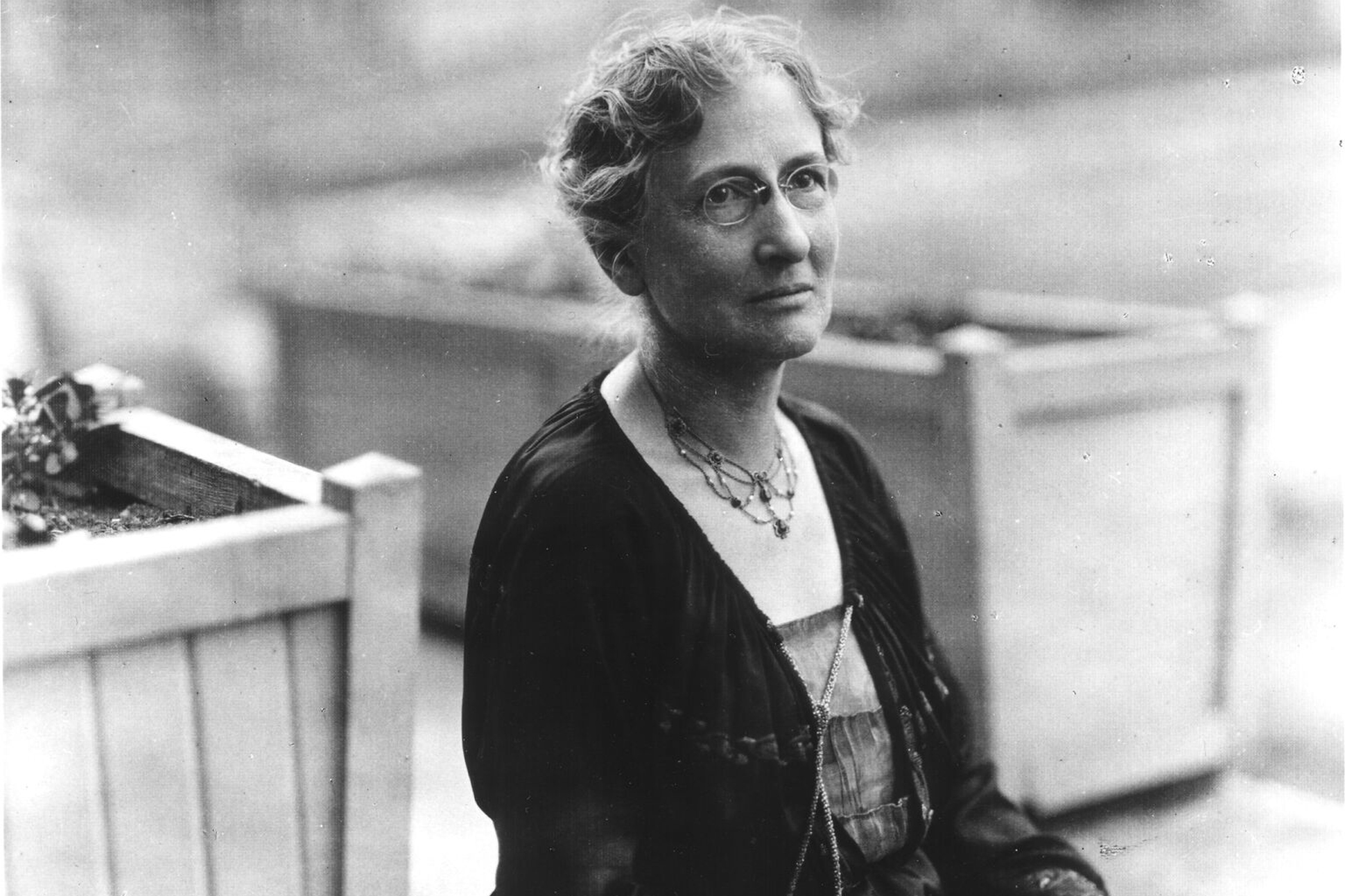
Harriet Monroe, founder and first editor of Poetry

Poetry: A Magazine of Verse was founded in Chicago in 1912 by Harriet Monroe, a poet, critic, and arts writer who wanted a magazine devoted specifically to contemporary poetry. In 1911, Monroe raised financial support for the publication by persuading one hundred Chicagoans to pledge $50 a year for five years.Literary scholar Ann Massa described the plan as "a bold project, if not an unlikely one", noting that the U.S. had not had a journal devoted solely to the publication and criticism of poetry and that Chicago had a reputation as difficult ground for little magazines. The magazine's motto, taken from Walt Whitman, was "to have great poets there must be great audiences too".

Monroe used the first issues to explain the magazine's purpose and editorial independence. In the inaugural issue, she argued that poetry needed "her own place, her own voice", rather than the limited space available in general-interest magazines. The following month, Monroe wrote that "The Open Door will be the policy of this magazine" and said the editors hoped to avoid "entangling alliances with any single class or school". In a later printed appeal to poets, Monroe described the magazine as offering writers "a chance to be heard in their own place", outside the constraints of popular magazines.

The University of Chicago Library notes that Monroe's insistence on paying contributors and establishing an annual prize helped raise the visibility and status of poetry as a literary art. The Modernist Journals Project describes Poetry as both a venue for modern poetry and a forum for debate over the forms and purposes of poetry in the modern age.

=== Early reputation and modernism ===
The magazine established its reputation in its early years by publishing a wide range of contemporary poets and by becoming a major venue for emerging modernist poetry. Literary scholar Helen Carr describes Poetry as "one of the best known of 'little magazines' of literary modernism" and as a periodical that exemplified the role of small magazines in the formation and dissemination of modernism. Its first issue included poems by Ezra Pound, Helen Dudley, William Vaughn Moody, Arthur Davison Ficke, Grace Hazard Conkling, and Emilia Stuart Lorimer, as well as Monroe's editorial comment "The Motive of the Magazine". Pound later served as the magazine's foreign correspondent, helping connect Monroe's Chicago-based publication to transatlantic literary networks.

In June 1915, Poetry published T. S. Eliot's "The Love Song of J. Alfred Prufrock", which had been brought to Monroe's attention by Pound. The magazine also published early or important work by writers including H.D., Robert Frost, Marianne Moore, Wallace Stevens, William Carlos Williams, Carl Sandburg, Langston Hughes, and Rabindranath Tagore. Encyclopædia Britannica identifies the magazine with both the Chicago literary renaissance and Imagism, and describes it as having become "the principal organ for modern poetry of the English-speaking world".

The magazine also became known for the range of writers published in its pages. The Poetry Foundation identifies notable poems by Gwendolyn Brooks, E. E. Cummings, Joyce Kilmer, Frank O'Hara, Sylvia Plath, and Margaret Walker as having appeared in Poetry. Its early records, correspondence, and editorial files have been used by scholars as evidence of the development of English-language poetry in the first half of the twentieth century.

=== After Monroe ===
Monroe edited the magazine until her death in 1936. The editorship then passed to Morton Dauwen Zabel and George Dillon. In 1942, after Dillon stepped down to serve in the armed forces during World War II, the magazine entered a period of group editorship. Editorial work during this period was shared by several figures, including Peter De Vries, Jessica Nelson North, Hayden Carruth, Katinka Loeser, John Frederick Nims, Margedant Peters, and Marion Strobel. Later mid-century editors included Carruth, Karl Shapiro, and Henry Rago.

Monroe had presented her poetry library, personal papers, and the magazine's editorial files to the University of Chicago in 1931. After her death, the materials helped form the Harriet Monroe Library of Modern Poetry and became part of the university's archival holdings on Poetry and twentieth-century verse. Additional records from the magazine's later history, including editorial correspondence, business files, issue proofs, author payment records, and publication files, are held by Indiana University's Lilly Library.

== Ruth Lilly bequest and Poetry Foundation era ==
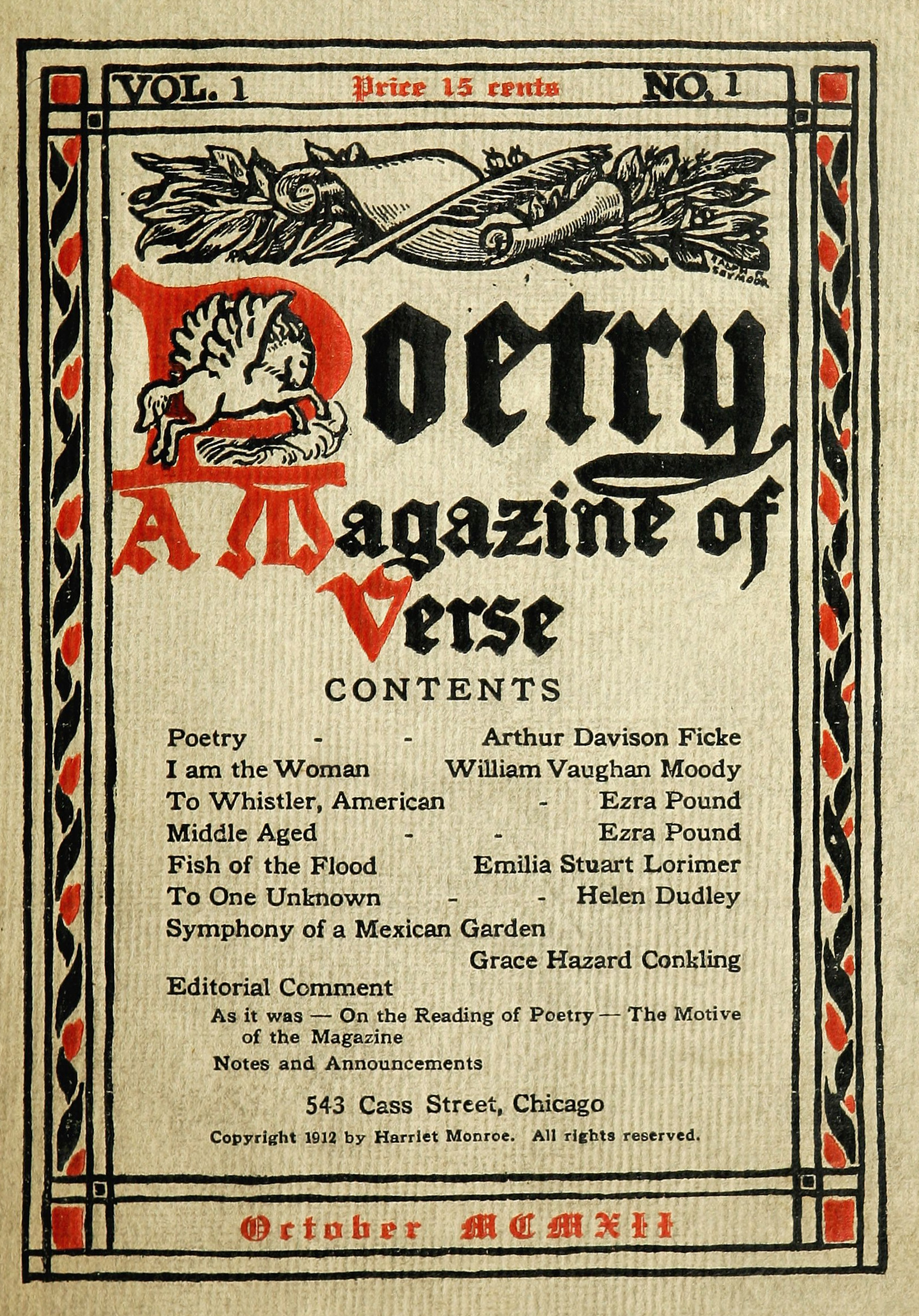
The cover of the magazine's first issue, published in October 1912

In 2002, Ruth Lilly, an heir to the Eli Lilly pharmaceutical fortune, gave $100 million to the Modern Poetry Association, then the publisher of Poetry. The gift was one of the largest ever made to an American literary organization. Later coverage described the bequest as being worth approximately $200 million.

The magazine learned in 2001 that it would receive the gift; the announcement was delayed while the organization's board was reconfigured. In 2003, the Modern Poetry Association was reorganized as the Poetry Foundation. The foundation established an endowment intended to support the magazine and expand poetry-related programming.

Joseph Parisi, who had edited Poetry for two decades, briefly led the new foundation after the gift was announced. Christian Wiman succeeded him as editor in 2003. Under Wiman, the magazine was redesigned, expanded its criticism, and increased contributor payments from two dollars to ten dollars per line. Its circulation also rose from about 11,000 to nearly 30,000 during this period.

The Lilly bequest changed the scale of the magazine's institutional setting, moving it from a small literary periodical supported by the Modern Poetry Association into the central publication of a large foundation.

=== Poetry Foundation building ===
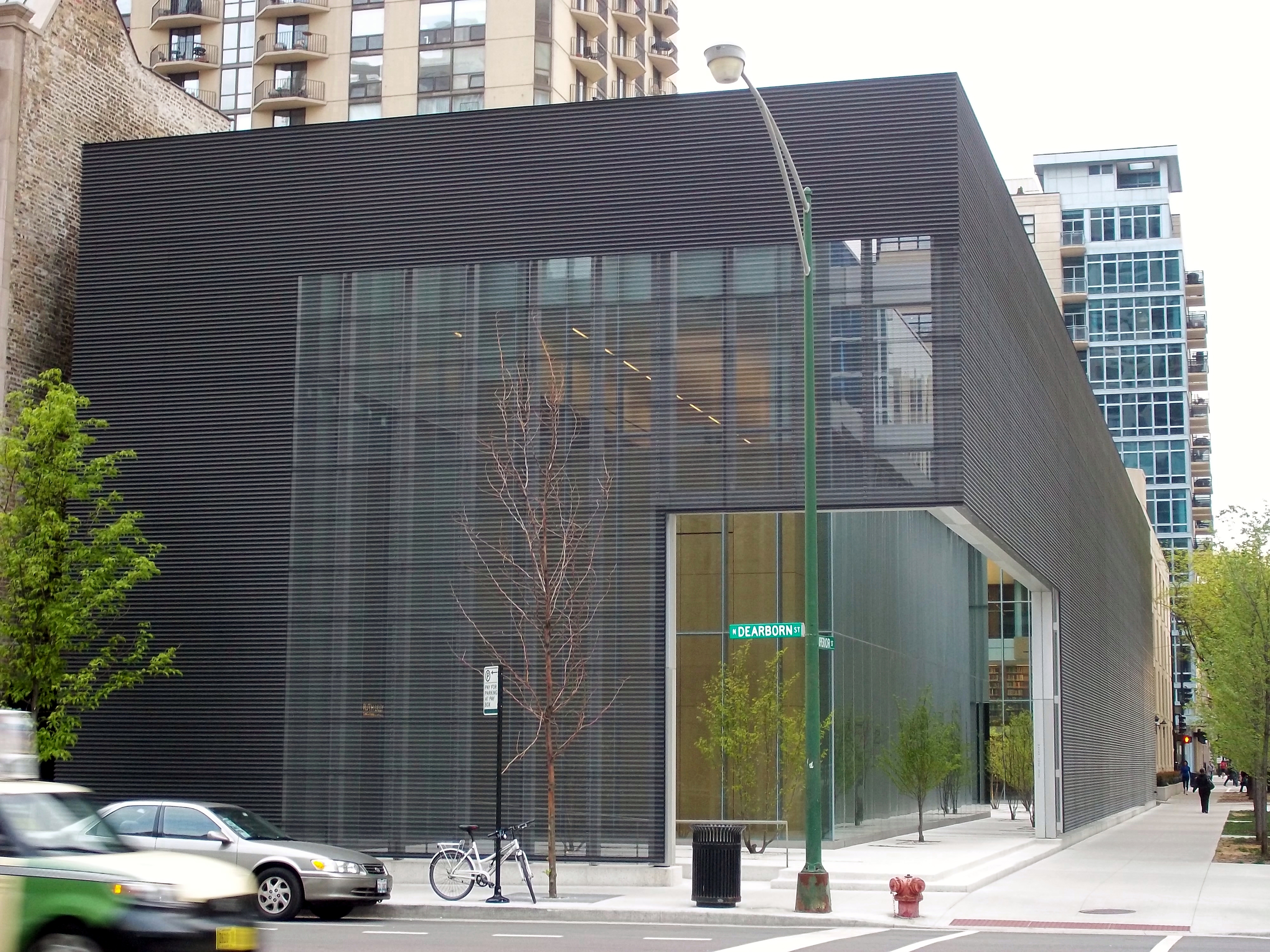
Poetry magazine's editorial offices and library in Chicago

After the Lilly gift, the foundation built a permanent home for Poetry in Chicago. The Poetry Foundation building, designed by John Ronan Architects, opened in 2011 at 61 West Superior Street. The building includes the magazine's offices, foundation offices, a public poetry library, an exhibition gallery, a public garden, and a performance space for readings and events.

=== Print and digital archive ===
Poetry is published in print and online. In 2020, Book Riot wrote that the magazine's entire archive was available online at no cost, and that print back issues could be purchased. The foundation describes its own digital archive as containing more than 1,200 issues.

=== Submission and editorial process ===
Poetry accepts submissions through Submittable from September 15 to June 15 each year. The magazine receives more than 100,000 poems annually and response times can be up to one year; in a 2023 interview with The Millions, editor Adrian Matejka said the magazine received about 12,000 submitted poems per month. Poets & Writers described Poetry and The New Yorker as prestigious poetry markets with "vanishingly small acceptance rates", while Book Riot cited Poetry's high submission volume in describing it as one of the hardest poetry magazines to publish in.

In a 2022 interview with Newcity, Matejka said he wanted the editorial process to involve "an actual conversation" and said poems were read multiple times, including aloud in editorial meetings; Michelle T. Boone said the organization was changing "the rotation of who's reading" and making room for more people to read, interpret, and recommend work for publication. Matejka told The Millions in 2023 that the magazine had limited poets to one appearance per year and aimed for half of each issue to feature poets new to Poetry. As of 2026, the magazine paid $500 for text or visual poems, $600 for video poems, and $400 per published page of prose.

=== Editorial controversies ===
==== 2006 essay by John Barr ====
In 2006, the magazine published an essay by John Barr, then president of the Poetry Foundation, titled "American Poetry in the New Century", which became controversial, generating many complaints and some support. After having heard a talk Barr gave on the subject, Christian Wiman asked Barr to submit it to the magazine.

"American poetry is ready for something new because our poets have been writing in the same way for a long time now", Barr wrote. He added that there was "fatigue" and "something stagnant" about contemporary poetry, and argued that poetry was nearly absent from public life because poets too often wrote only for other poets rather than for a broader public. Although M.F.A. programs had expanded greatly, Barr wrote that the result had been more poetry but also more limited variety, and that poetry had become "neither robust, resonant, nor — and I stress this quality — entertaining".

Barr also suggested that poets get experience outside the academy. Comparing poetry with drama in Shakespeare's day, the novel in the nineteenth century, and film in the twentieth century, he argued that an art enters a golden age when it is "addressed to and energized by the general audiences of its time".

Dana Goodyear, writing in The New Yorker, described Barr's essay as counter to the ideas of the magazine's founder, Harriet Monroe. Goodyear wrote that Monroe had wanted to protect poets from the demands of popular taste, while Barr wanted to induce poets to appeal to the public; she also noted that popular interest in poetry had declined since Monroe's time. Wiman later said he agreed with many of Barr's points about contemporary poetry.

==== 2020 criticism and editorial changes ====
In June 2020, the Poetry Foundation and Poetry faced criticism over the organization's response to protests against police violence and racism following the murder of George Floyd. An open letter signed by more than 1,000 poets and supporters criticized the foundation's initial statement as vague and lacking "any commitment to concrete action" and said contributors would withhold work from Poetry. The letter also called for the resignation of Foundation president Henry Bienen and board chair Willard Bunn III; on June 10, the foundation announced that Bienen's resignation had been accepted and that Bunn was stepping down as board chair.

The foundation and magazine staff later issued an open letter apologizing for "silence in the face of crisis" and pledging changes that included an equity audit of foundation policies and practices. Later that month, the editors of Poetry apologized for publishing Michael Dickman's poem "Scholls Ferry Rd." in the July/August 2020 issue, saying that the poem contained racist language and that publishing it "was a mistake".

The same day, the foundation announced that editor Don Share would step aside. In a subsequent editor's note, Share wrote that he accepted "sole responsibility" for publishing the poem and said his departure would be part of a restructuring of the magazine's editorial process.

==== 2023–2024 boycott and resolution ====
In November 2023, more than 2,000 poets, writers, and editors pledged to boycott the Poetry Foundation and Poetry after the magazine did not publish a review of Sam Sax's poetry collection PIG. The review was later published in The Poetry Project Newsletter, where its author wrote that it had originally been commissioned by the foundation and that an editor told him on October 8, 2023, that publication would be delayed.

The boycott’s organizers said it responded to a “recent instance of prejudiced silencing” and the “censoring of anti-Zionist Jewish writers”. The foundation later said it would be “reductive” to attribute the boycott to a single cause or incident.

The boycott ended in March 2024. The foundation said the boycott had been lifted after discussions with organizers, and Publishers Weekly reported that organizers had lifted the boycott, which it described as having begun over the organization's "silence on the war in Gaza".

== Awards and recognition ==
Poetry has received several National Magazine Awards from the American Society of Magazine Editors. In 2011, the magazine won General Excellence, Print, in the Literary, Political and Professional Magazines category. The Poetry magazine podcast also won a National Magazine Award for Digital Media in the Podcasting category that year.

In 2014, Poetry won General Excellence in the Literature, Science and Politics category. In 2020, John Lee Clark's essay "Tactile Art", published in the magazine's October 2019 issue, won the National Magazine Award for Essays and Criticism.

== Legacy and influence ==
Poetry has been treated by scholars and reference works as a central periodical in the development of modern English-language poetry, literary modernism, and the little-magazine movement. John Timberman Newcomb wrote that the magazine helped create a space for contemporary American verse where none had previously existed, that its early editorial program contributed to the self-definition of twentieth-century American avant-gardism, and that Poetry had a "transformative impact" upon American poetry and literary culture generally.

The magazine's early role has also been examined through its format, editorial policy, and place in modernist print culture. Bartholomew Brinkman argues that the design and presentation of Poetry: A Magazine of Verse helped shape how modern poetry was read, separating poetry from popular verse and presenting the poem as an aesthetic object on the page. In a later study of Chicago literary culture, Brinkman wrote that Poetry and The Little Review were instrumental in promoting the Chicago literary renaissance and Chicago modernism.

The magazine's archives have also been treated as a major record of twentieth-century poetry. The University of Chicago Library states that the magazine's records document, among other things, the development of English-language verse in the first half of the twentieth century.

The Beirut-based Arabic literary magazine Shi'r was named after Poetry.

== See also ==
- List of literary magazines

== Notes and references ==
Specific references:
