= The Best American Poetry 1988 =

The Best American Poetry 1988 book cover

The Best American Poetry 1988, the first volume in The Best American Poetry series, was edited by David Lehman and by guest editor John Ashbery, who chose one of his own poems among the group of 75.

== Lehman's forward ==
Although Lehman would later use his forewords as a kind of "state of poetry" review of the previous year, in this first volume he concentrated on the nature of this anthology, with most of the foreword given over to explaining the mechanics of the process (see The Best American Poetry series for those comments).

There seem to be plenty of creative writing programs, so it appears there will be an audience for the series, Lehman wrote, and with poetry appearing in so many different publications, an annual anthology could help readers find poetry in one place.

== Poets and poems included ==
Poet	Poem	Where poem previously appeared
A. R. Ammons	"Motion Which Disestablishes; Organizes Everything"	The Hudson Review
Ralph Angel	"Shadow Play"	Poetry
Rae Armantrout	"Bases"	o•blék
John Ash	"Memories of Italy"	Disbelief
John Ashbery	"One Coat of Paint"	Shenandoah
Ted Berrigan	"My Autobiography"	New American Writing
Mei-mei Berssenbrugge	"Chinese Space"	Conjunctions
George Bradley	"Noch Einmal, an Orpheus"	Grand Street
Stefan Brecht	"Momentariness"	Tyuonyi
Joseph Brodsky	"To Urania"	The Paris Review
Nicholas Christopher	"Miranda inReno"	The New Republic
Marc Cohen	"Mecox Road"	Verse
Wanda Coleman	"Essay on Language"	Heavy Daughter Blues
Clark Coolidge	"A Monologue"	o•blék
Alfred Corn	"New Year"	Partisan Review
Douglas Crase	"Dog Star Sale"	The Paris Review
Robert Creeley	"The Dream"	Exquisite Corpse
Thomas M. Disch	"In Memoriam"	Boulevard
Kenward Elmslie	"Top O' Silo"	Conjunctions
Alice Fulton	"Losing It"	Epoch
Amy Gerstler	"marriage"	New American Writing
Jorie Graham	"On Difficulty"	The End of Beauty
Debora Greger	"Snow White and Rose Red"	The New Yorker
Allen Grossman	"The Piano Player Explains Himself"	Grand Street
Barbara Guest	"Words"	Tyuonyi
Rachel Hadas	"Nourishment"	Boulevard
Donald Hall	"Prophecy"	The Paris Review
Robert Hass	"Thin Air"	Antaeus
Seamus Heaney	"A Shooting Script"	American Poetry Review
Anthony Hecht	"Envoi"	The Yale Review
Gerrit Henry	"The Confessions of Gerrit"	Mudfish
John Hollander	"An Old Story is Retold"	Partisan Review
Richard Howard	"The Foreigner Remembered by a Local Man"	For Nelson Mandela
Donald Justice	"Nostalgia of the Lakefronts"	Antaeus
Robert Kelly	"Hercules Musarum"	Tyuonyi
Kevin Killiam	"Pasolini"	Shiny International
August Kleinzahler	"Soda Water with a Boyhood Friend"	New American Writing
Caroline Knox	"Movement Along the Frieze"	New American Writing
Kenneth Koch	"What People Say About Paris"	Poetry
John Koethe	"Mistral"	The Paris Review
Philip Lamantia	"Unachieved"	Sulfur
Ann Lauterbach	"Psyche's Dream"	Before Recollection
David Lehman	"Operation Memory"	Shenandoah
Philip Levine	"A Walk with Tom Jefferson"	The Paris Review
Nathaniel Mackey	"Degree Four"	Conjunctions
Michael Malinowitz	"Funeral March for a Papagallo"	Aerial
Tom Mandel	"Hungry and Waiting"	Sulfur
Harry Mathews	"Histoire"	Armenian Papers
Bernadette Mayer	"Holding the Thought of Love"	Exquisite Corpse
James Merrill	"Farewell Performance"	Grand Street
Eileen Myles	"Public Television"	Shiny International
A. L. Nielson	"Route E"	Aerial
Ron Padgett	"Light As Air"	Boulevard
Michael Palmer	"From C"	o•blék
Bob Perelman	"Politics"	o•blék
Robert Pinsky	"The Hearts"	The New Republic
Donald Revell	"St. Lucy's Day"	Poetry
Joe Ross	"From Act I, Scene II of Guards of the Heart"	'Aerial
Leslie Scalapino	"Jumping-jack flash"	Conjunctions
James Schuyler	"Let's All Hear It for Mildred Bailey!"	Poetry
David Shapiro	"Empathy for David Winfield"	Diamonds are Forever: Artists and Writers on Baseball
Charles Simic	"St Thomas Aquinas"	Antaeus
Gary Snyder	"Walking the New York Bedrock; Alive in the Sea of Information"	Sulfur
Ruth Stone	"The Latest Hotel Guest Walks Over; Particles That Revolve in Seven; Other Dimensions Controlling Latticed Space"	American Poetry Review
May Swenson	"Dummy, 51, to Go to Museum. Ventriloquist Dead at 75"	In Other Words
James Tate	"Neighbors"	Sonora Review
Lydia Tomkiw	"Six of Ox Is"	New American Writing
Derek Walcott	"Elsewhere"	The Arkansas Testament
Rosanne Wasserman	"Inuit and Seal"	Sulfur
Marjorie Welish	"Respected, Feared, and Somehow Loved"	o•blék
Susan Wheeler	"What Memory Reveals"	Sulfur
Richard Wilbur	"Trolling for Blues"	Poetry
Alan Williamson	"Recitation for Dismantling the Hydrogen Bomb"	American Poetry Review
John Yau	"Genghis Chan: Private Eye"	Sulfur
Geoffrey Young	"Drive, It Said"	New American Writing

== See also ==
- 1988 in poetry
