= 1988 in poetry =

Nationality words link to articles with information on the nation's poetry or literature (for instance, Irish or France).

== Events ==
- The first annual The Best American Poetry volume is published this year.
- During a poetry reading in which popular Russian poet Andrei Voznesensky takes written questions from the audience, he reads out two responses: "All of you are Jews or sold out to Jews", one reads. Another only says, "We will kill you". In The Ditch: A Spiritual Trial, published in 1986, Voznesensky had written poetry and prose about a 1941 German massacre of 12,000 Russians in the Crimea, and the looting of their mass graves in the 1980s by Soviet citizens that was tolerated, he said, by officials because the victims were primarily Jews. Voznesensky reads the notes out loud and challenges the writers to identify themselves. None does.

== Works published in English ==
Listed by nation where the work was first published and again by the poet's native land, if different; substantially revised works listed separately:

=== Australia ===
- Robert Gray, Piano
- Jennifer Maiden, The Trust, Black Lightning, Australia
- Chris Mansell, Redshift/Blueshift, Five Islands Press
- Chris Wallace-Crabbe, I'm Deadly Serious, Oxford: Oxford University Press

=== Canada ===
- Louis Dudek, Infinite Worlds: The Poetry of Louis Dudek. Robin Blaser ed. Montreal: Véhicule Press.
- Elisabeth Harvor, If Only We Could Drive Like This Forever
- Dorothy Livesay, Beginnings. Winnipeg: Peguis.
- Roy Miki, Tracing the Paths, about bp nichol, critical study;
- Raymond Souster, Asking for More. Ottawa: Oberon Press.

=== India, in English ===
- Jayanta Mahapatra, Burden and Fruit ( Poetry in English ), Washington, D.C.: Three Continents Press
- Eunice de Souza, Women in Dutch Painting, Bombay: XAL-PRAXIS
- Meena Alexander, House of a Thousand Doors ( Poetry and prose in English ), Washington, D.C.: Three Continents Press, by an Indian writing living in and published in the United States
- Sujata Bhatt, Brunizem (Poetry in English), Carcanet Press and New Delhi: Penguin; won the Commonwealth Poetry Prize (Asia) and the Alice Hunt Bartlett Award
- Robin Ngangom, Words and the Silence ( Poetry in English ), Calcutta: Writers Workshop

=== Ireland ===
- Ciaran Carson, The New Estate and Other Poems, Oldcastle: New Gallery Press, ISBN 978-1-85235-032-1
- Harry Clifton, The Liberal Cage, Oldcastle: New Gallery Press, ISBN 978-1-85235-026-0
- Paul Durcan, Jesus and Angela, Irish poet published in the United Kingdom
- Seamus Heaney: The Sounds of Rain, Emory University, Northern Irish poet at this time living in the United States
- Valentin Iremonger, Sandymount, Dublin, including "This Houre Her Vigill", "Clear View in Summer" and "Icarus"
- Thomas Kinsella:
  - Blood and Family, including "The Messenger" and "Out of Ireland"
  - One Fond Embrace: Peppercanister 13
- Philippe Jaccottet, The Selected Poems of Philippe Jaccottet, Viking, translated from French by Derek Mahon, Irish poet published in the United Kingdom
- Medbh McGuckian, On Ballycastle Beach Northern Irish poet published in the United Kingdom

=== New Zealand ===
- Fleur Adcock, Meeting the Comet, Newcastle upon Tyne: Bloodaxe Books (New Zealand poet who moved to England in 1963)
- Jenny Bornholdt, This Big Face
- Allen Curnow, Continuum: New and Later Poems 1972–1988
- Lauris Edmond, Summer Near the Arctic Circle
- Michele Leggott, Like This?: Poems, Christchurch: Caxton Press, New Zealand
- Cilla McQueen, Benzina winner of the 1989 New Zealand Book Award for Poetry
- Ian Wedde, Tendering
- Lydia Wevers, editor, Yellow Pencils: Contemporary Poetry by New Zealand Women, anthology

=== United Kingdom ===
- Fleur Adcock, Meeting the Comet, Newcastle upon Tyne: Bloodaxe Books (New Zealand poet who moved to England in 1963)
- Patricia Beer, Collected Poems
- Alison Brackenbury, Christmas Roses
- Ciarán Carson: The New Estate and Other Poems, Gallery Press, Irish poet published in the United Kingdom
- Charles Causley, A Field of Vision
- Jack Clemo, Selected Poems
- Wendy Cope:
  - Does She Like Word-Games?
  - Men and their Boring Arguments
- Helen Dunmore, The Raw Garden
- Douglas Dunn, Northlight
- Paul Durcan, Jesus and Angela, Irish poet published in the United Kingdom
- Elaine Feinstein, Mother's Girl: Hutchinson
- David Gascoyne, Collected Poems
- Lee Harwood, Crossing the frozen river: selected poems
- Ian Hamilton, Fifty Poems
- Seamus Heaney: The Sounds of Rain, Emory University, Northern Ireland native at this time living in the United States
- John Heath-Stubbs:
  - Collected Poems 1942-1987, Carcanet Press
  - A Partridge in a Pear Tree: Poems for the Twelve Days of Christmas
  - Time Pieces, Hearing Eye. ISBN 1-870841-02-6
- Selima Hill, My Darling Camel
- Libby Houston, Necessity
- Ted Hughes, Moon-Whales, first British edition; published originally in the United States, 1976
- Mick Imlah, Birthmarks (Chatto & Windus, ISBN 978-0-7011-3358-0)
- Philippe Jaccottet, The Selected Poems of Philippe Jaccottet, translated from French by Derek Mahon, Viking
- Philip Larkin, Collected Poems
- Alan Jenkins, In the Hot-House
- Philip Larkin (died 1985), Collected Poems, edited by Anthony Thwaite
- Tim Liardet, Clay Hill (Seren, ISBN 0907476880)
- George MacBeth, Anatomy of a Divorce
- Norman MacCaig, Voice-Over
- Medbh McGuckian, On Ballycastle Beach Northern Ireland poet published in the United Kingdom
- Edwin Morgan, Themes on a Variation
- Grace Nichols, editor, Black Poetry, illustrated by Michael Lewis, Blackie (London, England), published as Poetry Jump-Up, Penguin (Harmondsworth, England), in 1989
- Brian Patten, Storm Damage
- Kathleen Raine, To the Sun
- Peter Reading, Final Demands
- Jeremy Reed, Engaging Form
- Carol Rumens, The Greening of the Snow Beach
- E. J. Scovell, Collected Poems
- Peter Scupham, The Air Show
- Jo Shapcott, Electroplating the Baby
- Lemn Sissay, Tender Fingers in a Clenched Fist
- R.S. Thomas, The Echoes Return Slow
- Nika Turbina, First Draft: Poems by Nika Turbina, translated by Elaine Feinstein and Antonina W. Bouis, Marion Boyars
- Heathcote Williams, Whale Nation

==== Anthologies ====
- The New British Poetry, a poetry anthology, jointly edited by Gillian Allnutt, Fred D'Aguiar, Ken Edwards and Eric Mottram, respectively concerned with feminist, Afro-Caribbean, younger and British poetry revival poets, all writing from 1968 to 1988
- Elaine Feinstein, editor, PEN New Poetry II, Quartet

=== United States ===
- Meena Alexander, House of a Thousand Doors, poetry and prose, Washington, D.C.: Three Continents Press, by an Indian writing living in and published in the United States
- Ted Berrigan, A Certain Slant of Sunlight
- Joseph Brodsky: To Urania : Selected Poems, 1965-1985, New York: Farrar, Straus & Giroux Russian-American
- Gwendolyn Brooks, Winnie
- Raymond Carver, In a Marine Light: Selected Poems
- Maxine Chernoff, Japan (Avenue B Press)
- Billy Collins, The Apple That Astonished Paris
- Seamus Heaney: The Sounds of Rain, Emory University, Northern Ireland native at this time living in the United States
- Jane Hirshfield, Of Gravity & Angels
- John Hollander:
  - Melodious Guile: Fictive Pattern in Poetic Language
  - Harp Lake
- Ono no Komachi and Izumi Shikibu, The Ink Dark Moon: Love Poems by Ono no Komachi and Izumi Shikibu, Women of the Ancient Court of Japan (posthumous), translated by Jane Hirshfield and Mariko Aratani
- Federico García Lorca, Poeta en Nueva York first translation into English as "Poet in New York" this year (written in 1930, first published posthumously in 1940)
- William Logan, Sullen Weedy Lakes
- James Merrill, The Inner Room
- W. S. Merwin:
  - The Rain in the Trees, New York: Knopf
  - Selected Poems, New York: Atheneum
- Michael Palmer, Sun
- Marie Ponsot, The Green Dark
- Rosmarie Waldrop, Shorter American Memory (Paradigm Press)

==== Poets appearing in The Best American Poetry 1988 ====
The 75 poets included in The Best American Poetry 1988, edited by David Lehman, co-edited this year by John Ashbery:

- A. R. Ammons
- Ralph Angel
- Rae Armantrout
- John Ash
- John Ashbery
- Ted Berrigan
- Mei-mei Berssenbrugge
- George Bradley
- Stefan Brecht
- Joseph Brodsky
- Nicholas Christopher
- Marc Cohen
- Wanda Coleman
- Clark Coolidge
- Alfred Corn
- Douglas Crase
- Robert Creeley
- Thomas M. Disch
- Kenward Elmslie
- Alice Fulton
- Amy Gerstler
- Jorie Graham
- Debora Greger
- Allen Grossman
- Barbara Guest
- Rachel Hadas
- Donald Hall
- Robert Hass
- Seamus Heaney
- Anthony Hecht
- Gerrit Henry
- John Hollander
- Richard Howard
- Donald Justice
- Robert Kelly
- Kevin Killiam
- August Kleinzahler
- Carolina Knox
- Kenneth Koch
- John Koethe
- Philip Lamantia
- Ann Lauterbach
- David Lehman
- Philip Levine
- Nathaniel Mackey
- Michael Malinowitz
- Tom Mandel
- Harry Mathews
- Bernadette Mayer
- James Merrill
- Eileen Myles
- A. L. Nielson
- Ron Padgett
- Michael Palmer
- Bob Perelman
- Robert Pinsky
- Donald Revell
- Joe Ross
- Leslie Scalapino
- James Schuyler
- David Shapiro
- Charles Simic
- Gary Snyder
- Ruth Stone
- May Swenson
- James Tate
- Lydia Tomkiw
- Derek Walcott
- Rosanne Wasserman
- Majorie Welish
- Susan Wheeler
- Richard Wilbur
- Alan Williamson
- John Yau
- Geoffrey Young

=== Other works published in English ===
- Frank Birbalsingh, Jahaji Bhai: An Anthology of Indo–Caribbean Literature
- Breyten Breytenbach, Judas Eye: 63 prison poems of an indefinite colour, South African
- Jayanta Mahapatra, Burden of Waves & Fruit, India

== Works published in other languages ==
Listed by nation where the work was first published and again by the poet's native land, if different; substantially revised works listed separately:

=== Arabic language ===
- Nizar Qabbani, Syrian:
  - Three Stone-throwing Children
  - Secret Papers of a Karmathian Lover
  - Biography of an Arab Executioner

=== French language ===
- Michel Deguy, Comité ("Committee"), a book attacking French publishers for using poets they rarely publish themselves to help determine which books of poetry to accept; France
- Abdellatif Laabi, translator, Je t'aime au gré de la mort, translated from the original Arabic of Samih al-Qâsim into French; Paris: Unesco/Éditions de Minuit
- Jean Royer, Poèmes d'amour, 1966-1986, Montréal: l'Hexagone; Canada

=== India ===
Listed in alphabetical order by first name:

- Debarati Mitra, Bhutera O Khuki, Kolkata: Ananda Publishers; Bengali-language
- K. Satchidanandan, Veedumattam, ("Changing House"); Malayalam-language
- K. Siva Reddy, Mohana! Oh Mohana!, Hyderabad: Jhari Poetry Circle, Telugu-language
- Kedarnath Singh, Akal Mein Saras, Delhi: Rajkamal Prakashan; Hindi
- Mallika Sengupta, Ami Sindhur Meye, Kolkata: Prativas Publication; Bengali-language
- Nitin Mehta, Nirvan, Ahmedabad: Chandramauli Prakashan; Gujarati-language
- Panna Nayak, ' 'Nisbat' '; Gujarati-language
- Rajendra Kishore Panda, Anya, Cuttack: Friends Publishers, Oraya-language
- Prathibha Nandakumar, Itanaka ("Until Now"), Bangalore: Kannada Sangha, Christ College; Kannada-language
- Tulasibahadur Chetri, nicknamed "Apatan", Karna-Kunti; Nepali-language

=== Poland ===
- Stanisław Barańczak, Widokowka z tego swiata ("A Postcard from the Other World"), Paris: Zeszyty Literackie
- Ryszard Krynicki, Niepodlegli nicości (wybrane i poprawione wiersze i przekłady) ("Independent Nothingness (Selected and Revised Poems and Translations)"); Warsaw: NOWA
- Piotr Sommer, Czynnik liryczny i inne wiersze

=== Spanish Language Poetry ===
- Mario Benedetti, Yesterday y mañana ("Yesterday and Tomorrow"), Uruguay
- Giannina Braschi, El imperio de los sueños ("Empire of Dreams"), Puerto Rican writer published in Spain (Barcelona)
- Justo Jorge Padrón
  - Antología poética, 1971-1988
  - Los dones de la tierra
- Isabel Sabogal, „Requiebros vanos”, Lima

=== Other languages ===
- Gösta Ågren, Jär ("Here"), Swedish-language, Finland
- "Biblioteca de autores contemporaneos / Mario Benedetti - El autor" (in Spanish), retrieved May 27, 2009. Archived 2009-05-30.
- Dieter Breuer, editor, Deutsche Lyrik nach 1945, Frankfurt: Suhrkamp (scholarship) West Germany
- Christoph Buchwald, general editor, and Friederike Roth, guest editor, Luchterhand Jahrbuch der Lyrik 1988/89 ("Luchterhand Poetry Yearbook 1988/89"), publisher: Luchterhand; anthology; West Germany
- Niels Frank, Genfortryllelsen, Denmark
- Haim Gouri, Heshbon Over ("Current Account, Selected Poems"), Israeli writing in Hebrew
- Klaus Høeck, Lukas O'Kech, publisher: Brøndum; Denmark
- Nuala Ní Dhomhnaill, Selected Poems: Rogha Danta, Gaelic-language, Ireland
- Rami Saari, Hinne, Matzati Et Beyti ("Behold, I Found My Home"), Israeli writing in Hebrew

== Awards and honors ==
=== Australia ===
- C. J. Dennis Prize for Poetry: Judith Beveridge, The Domesticity of Giraffes
- Kenneth Slessor Prize for Poetry: Judith Beveridge, The Domesticity of Giraffes
- Mary Gilmore Prize: Judith Beveridge, The Domesticity of Giraffes

=== Canada ===
- Gerald Lampert Award: Di Brandt, Questions I Asked My Mother
- Archibald Lampman Award: John Barton, West of Darkness
- 1988 Governor General's Awards: Erín Moure, Furious (English); Marcel Labine, Papiers d'épidémie (French)
- Pat Lowther Award: Gwendolyn MacEwan, Afterworlds
- Prix Alain-Grandbois: Pierre Morency, Effets personnels
- Dorothy Livesay Poetry Prize: Patricia Young, All I Ever Needed Was a Beautiful Room
- Prix Émile-Nelligan: Renaud Longchamps, Légendes suivi de Sommation sur l’histoire

=== India ===
- Sahitya Akademi Award : Vikram Seth for The Golden Gate, a book of sonnets
- Poetry Society India National Poetry Competition : Vijay Nambisan for Madras Central

=== United Kingdom ===
- Cholmondeley Award : John Heath-Stubbs, Sean O'Brien, John Whitworth
- Eric Gregory Award : Michael Symmons Roberts, Gwyneth Lewis, Adrian Blackledge, Simon Armitage, Robert Crawford
- Queen's Gold Medal for Poetry : Derek Walcott
- National Poetry Competition : Martin Reed for The Widow's Dream

=== United States ===
- Agnes Lynch Starrett Poetry Prize: Maxine Scates, Toluca Street
- Aiken Taylor Award for Modern American Poetry: Richard Wilbur
- AML Award for poetry to Dennis Marden Clark for Tinder: answer might be. With an almost Augustinian Dry Poems
- Bernard F. Connors Prize for Poetry: David Lehman, "Mythologies"
- Frost Medal: Carolyn Kizer
- Poet Laureate Consultant in Poetry to the Library of Congress appointed: Howard Nemerov (also served 1963-64 in the same position, then named "Consultant in Poetry to the Library of Congress")
- Pulitzer Prize for Poetry: William Meredith: Partial Accounts: New and Selected Poems
- Rhysling Award:
  - Lucius Shepard, White Trains (Long Form)
  - Bruce Boston, The Nightmare Collector (Short Form, tie)
  - Suzette Haden Elgin, Rocky Road to Hoe (Short Form, tie)
- Ruth Lilly Poetry Prize: Anthony Hecht
- Whiting Awards: Michael Burkard, Li-Young Lee, Sylvia Moss
- Fellowship of the Academy of American Poets: Donald Justice

== Births ==
- 19 June – Sarah Kay, American poet
- 1 August – Warsan Shire, African-born British poet
- 1 October – Michaela Coel, English poet, singer-songwriter, screenwriter, actress and playwright
- 14 October – Ocean Vuong, Vietnamese-born American poet
- Jay Bernard, English writer and artist
- Andrew McMillan, English poet and lecturer

== Deaths ==
Birth years link to the corresponding "[year] in poetry" article:

- January 3 – Rose Ausländer, 86 (born 1901), Jewish poet writing in German
- February 3 – Robert Duncan, 69 (born 1919), American poet, heart attack
- March 19 – Máirtín Ó Direáin, 77 (born 1910), Irish poet writing in the Irish language
- March 26 – Henri Coulette, 60 (born 1927), American poet
- March 30 – John Clellon Holmes, 62 (born 1926), American poet and beat novelist, cancer
- May 3 – Premendra Mitra (born 1904) Bengali poet, novelist, short-story writer, including thrillers and science fiction
- June 16 – Miguel Piñero, 41 (born 1946), Puerto Rican-born American playwright, actor and co-founder of the Nuyorican Poets Café, cirrhosis of the liver
- June 27 – Léonie Adams, 88 (born 1899), American poet
- July 24 – Mira Schendel, 69 (born 1919), Swiss-born Brazilian modernist artist and poet
- September 18 – Mohammad-Hossein Shahriar, 81 (born 1906), Iranian Azari poet
- October 1 – Sir Sacheverell Sitwell, 90 (born 1897), English writer and arts critic
- October 11 – Joel Oppenheimer, 58 (born 1930), American poet and columnist
- October 16 – Christian Matras, 87 (born 1900), Faroese poet and linguist
- November 2 – Stewart Parker, 47 (born 1941), Northern Irish poet and playwright
- November 8 – Hamad al-Hajji, 49 (born 1939), Saudi Arabian poet

== See also ==
- Poetry
- List of years in poetry
- List of poetry awards
