= List of winners of the Lenore Marshall Poetry Prize =

The Lenore Marshall Poetry Prize is administered by the Academy of American Poets selected by the New Hope Foundation in 1994. Established in 1975, this $25,000 award recognizes the most outstanding book of poetry published in the United States in the previous year.

The Prize was created in 1975 by the New Hope Foundation of Pennsylvania, which was a philanthropic foundation created by Lenore Marshall and her husband, James Marshall, to "support the arts and the cause of world peace"; Lenore Marshall, a poet, novelist, editor, and peace activist, had died in 1971. Receipt of the prize has been among the distinctions noted by the Library of Congress when the Poet Laureate of the United States is named.

The Prize was initially administered by the Saturday Review magazine. Following the folding of Saturday Review, the Prize was administered by The Nation magazine. In 1995, administration of the Prize became the responsibility of the Academy; the Prize has a permanent endowment. The Prize is still sponsored by The Nation, which usually publishes an article about the poetry of each year's finalists and winner. The cash value of the prize is currently $25,000.

== Winners ==
| Year | Poet | Book | Judges |
|---|---|---|---|
| 1975 | Cid Corman | O/I | Hayden Carruth |
| 1976 | Denise Levertov | The Freeing of the Dust | Hayden Carruth |
| 1977 | Philip Levine | The Names of the Lost | William Stafford, Carolyn Kizer, Charles Wright |
| 1978 | Allen Tate | Collected Poems, 1919-1976 | Alastair Reid, John Hollander, May Swenson |
| 1979 | Hayden Carruth | Brothers, I Loved You All | Alastair Reid, Galway Kinnell, Mark Strand |
| 1980 | Stanley Kunitz | The Poems of Stanley Kunitz, 1928-1978 | William Jay Smith, Cynthia Macdonald, Quincy Troupe |
| 1981 | Sterling A. Brown | The Collected Poems of Sterling A. Brown | Philip Levine, Michael S. Harper, Jean Valentine |
| 1982 | John Logan | The Bridge of Change: Poems 1974-1980 | William Jay Smith, Carolyn Kizer, Paul Zweig |
| 1983 | George Starbuck | The Argot Merchant Disaster | Dana Gioia, May Swenson, Sydney Lea |
| 1984 | Josephine Miles | Collected Poems, 1930-83 | Alfred Corn, Josephine Jacobsen, Donald Justice |
| 1985 | John Ashbery | A Wave | Dave Smith, Rika Lesser, John Hollander |
| 1986 | Howard Moss | New Selected Poems | J. D. McClatchy, Richard Howard, Rachel Hadas |
| 1987 | Donald Hall | The Happy Man | Robert Pinsky, Ellen Bryant Voigt, Douglas Crase |
| 1988 | Josephine Jacobsen | The Sisters: New & Selected Poems | William Jay Smith, Robert Phillips, Katha Pollitt |
| 1989 | Thomas McGrath | Selected Poems, 1938-1988 | Amy Clampitt, Richard Kenney, Robert Shaw |
| 1990 | Michael Ryan | God Hunger | William Pritchard, Sydney Lea, Liz Rosenberg |
| 1991 | John Haines | New Poems, 1980-88 | Donald Hall, Josephine Jacobsen, Molly Peacock |
| 1992 | Adrienne Rich | An Atlas of the Difficult World | Mona Van Duyn, Edward Hirsch, Thomas Lux |
| 1993 | Thom Gunn | The Man with Night Sweats | Robert Pinsky, Carol Muske, James Tate |
| 1994 | W. S. Merwin | Travels | Gerald Stern, Deborah Digges, Stephen Dunn |
| 1995 | Marilyn Hacker | Winter Numbers | Maxine Kumin, Cornelius Eady, Alice Fulton |
| 1996 | Charles Wright | Chickamauga | Philip Levine, Yusef Komunyakaa, Laurie Sheck |
| 1997 | Robert Pinsky | The Figured Wheel: New and Collected Poems 1966-1996 | Mark Doty, Susan Mitchell, Mary Oliver |
| 1998 | Mark Jarman | Questions for Ecclesiastes | Charles Simic, Chase Twichell, Charles Wright |
| 1999 | Wanda Coleman | Bathwater Wine | Rafael Campo, Toi Derricotte, Marilyn Hacker |
| 2000 | David Ferry | Of No Country I Know: New and Selected Poems and Translations | W. S. Di Piero, Mary Kinzie, Eleanor Wilner |
| 2001 | Fanny Howe | Selected Poems | Elaine Equi, Ann Lauterbach, Bob Perelman |
| 2002 | Madeline DeFrees | Blue Dusk | Joy Harjo, Michael S. Harper, Lawson Inada |
| 2003 | Eamon Grennan | Still Life with Waterfall | Judith Ortiz Cofer, Andrew Hudgins, Robert Wrigley |
| 2004 | Donald Revell | My Mojave | Brenda Hillman, Forrest Gander, Harryette Mullen |
| 2005 | Anne Winters | The Displaced of Capital | Louise Glück, Robert Pinsky, Alan Shapiro |
| 2006 | Eleanor Lerman | Our Post-Soviet History Unfolds | Carl Dennis, Tony Hoagland, Carol Muske-Dukes |
| 2007 | Alice Notley | Grave of Light: New and Selected Poems 1970–2005 | David Baker, Mark McMorris, Marie Ponsot |
| 2008 | Henri Cole | Blackbird and Wolf | Lucie Brock-Broido, B. H. Fairchild, John Koethe |
| 2009 | Linda Gregg | All of It Singing: New and Selected Poems | Dorianne Laux, J. D. McClatchy, James Richardson |
| 2010 | John Koethe | Ninety-fifth Street | Marianne Boruch, David Kirby, John Yau |
| 2011 | C.D. Wright | One With Others | Mei-mei Berssenbrugge, D. A. Powell, Martha Ronk |
| 2012 | David Wojahn | World Tree | Linda Gregerson, David St. John, Natasha Trethewey |
| 2013 | Patricia Smith | Shoulda Been Jimi Savannah | Cornelius Eady, Claudia Emerson, Gregory Orr |
| 2014 | Rigoberto González | Unpeopled Eden | Kwame Dawes, Alicia Suskin Ostriker, Susan Stewart |
| 2015 | Kevin Young | The Book of Hours | Marie Howe, A. Van Jordan, Donald Revell |
| 2016 | Lynn Emanuel | The Nerve of It: Poems New and Selected | Amy Gerstler, Reginald Gibbons, Kimiko Hahn |
| 2017 | Patrick Rosal | Brooklyn Antediluvian | Rigoberto González, Vijay Seshadri, Susan Wheeler |
| 2018 | Craig Morgan Teicher | The Trembling Answers | Laura Kasischke, Campbell McGrath, Mary Szybist |
| 2019 | Kyle Dargan | Anagnorisis | Major Jackson, Patricia Smith, David Wojahn |
| 2020 | Hanif Abdurraqib | A Fortune for Your Disaster | Garrett Hongo, Tim Seibles, Roque Salas Rivera |
| 2022 | Mai Der Vang | Yellow Rain | |
| 2023 | Ama Codjoe | Bluest Nude: Poems | |
