= Sharon Mesmer =

American poet

Sharon Mesmer (born in 1960) is a Polish-American poet, fiction writer, essayist and professor of creative writing. Her poetry collections are Annoying Diabetic Bitch (Combo Books, 2008), The Virgin Formica (Hanging Loose Press, 2008), Vertigo Seeks Affinities (chapbook, Belladonna Books, 2007), Half Angel, Half Lunch (Hard Press, 1998) and Crossing Second Avenue (chapbook, ABJ Press, Tokyo, 1997, published to coincide with a month-long reading tour of Japan sponsored by American Book Jam magazine). Her fiction collections are Ma Vie à Yonago (Hachette Littératures, Paris, in French translation by Daniel Bismuth, 2005), In Ordinary Time (Hanging Loose Press, 2005) and The Empty Quarter (Hanging Loose Press, 2005). She teaches in the undergraduate and graduate programs of New York University and The New School. She has lived in Brooklyn, New York since 1988 and is a distant relative of Franz Anton Mesmer, proponent of animal magnetism (or mesmerism) and Otto Messmer, the American animator best known for creating Felix the Cat.

== Career ==
Mesmer, the daughter of second-generation Polish and German immigrants, was born and raised on the south side of Chicago, in the Back of the Yards neighborhood. The area, named for its proximity to the infamous Union Stockyards, was the subject of Upton Sinclair's 1906 novel, The Jungle. Her first published poems were “The Nordic Skull In Double Exposure” which appeared in Maureen Owen's New York-based literary magazine, Telephone and “The Anger of Animals” appeared in Intro 12, a magazine of the Association of Writers and Writing Programs.

Mesmer received a B.A. in Writing/English from Columbia College, where she and other female students of the poet Paul Hoover, notably Lydia Tomkiw and Deborah Pintonelli, became instrumental in galvanizing the links between the Chicago poetry and punk music scenes (other prominent local poets at that time included Elaine Equi and Jerome Sala). Mesmer, Pintonelli and poet Connie Deanovich published the literary magazine B City, and later Mesmer, Pintonelli and poet/fiction writer Carl Watson published the broadsheet letter eX. They were frequent readers at the Get Me High Lounge in the Wicker Park area of Chicago, and early poetry slam competitors (Mesmer was later a slam semi-finalist at the Nuyorican Poets Café in New York).

After Mesmer left Chicago for New York, she became a student of Allen Ginsberg in the Brooklyn College MFA poetry program. Through Ginsberg's nomination, she was awarded a MacArthur Scholarship (given through the college from a gift by John Ashbery) and represented the college in the Poetry Society of America's “Best of New York Writing Programs.” Writing about Mesmer's first book, Half Angel, Half Lunch, Ginsberg characterized her work as “always interesting, beautifully bold and vivaciously modern.” It was through the poet that Mesmer was introduced to Buddhist practice. Because of her association with Ginsberg, she is considered a post-Beat poet (see Beat Generation). Her early work also evinces ties to the New York School and post-Language poetry. By 2003 Mesmer was one of earliest practitioners of flarf poetry, the first poetry movement of the 21st century. She performed with other members of the flarf collective at the Walker Arts Center in Minneapolis, MN in 2008 and at the Whitney Museum in New York City in 2009, as part of the “Flarf Versus Conceptual” event. Four of her flarf poems appear in the Postmodern American Poetry: A Norton Anthology (second edition, 2013).

Mesmer lectures and performs her work widely: at the 2010 Iceland Wave Festival in Reykjavik, Iceland; at a reading and panel discussion sponsored by the Danish Writers' Union in 2010; and at the Ovidius Festival at Neptun Beach, Romania, in 2009. Her work has appeared in Poetry, the Wall Street Journal, New American Writing, the Evergreen Review, Eleven Eleven, and the Brooklyn Rail, among others. Anthology appearances include I'll Drown My Book: Conceptual Writing By Women (Les Figues, 2012), Poems for the Nation: Edited by Allen Ginsberg (Seven Stories Press, 2000) and The Outlaw Bible of American Poetry (Thunder's Mouth Press, 1999).

=== Awards and recognition ===
Mesmer's awards include a Fulbright Specialist grant (2011), an Alumna of the Year Award from Columbia College Chicago (2009), a Jerome Foundation/SASE award (as mentor to poet Elisabeth Workman, grantee, 2009) and two New York Foundation for the Arts fellowships (2007 and 1999).

== Works ==
Poetry
Crossing Second Avenue (ABJ Books, Japan, 1997)
Half Angel, Half Lunch (Hard Press, 1998)
Vertigo Seeks Affinities (Belladonna Books, 2006)
Annoying Diabetic Bitch (Combo Books, 2008)
The Virgin Formica (Hanging Loose Press, 2008)
Greetings From My Girlie Leisure Place (Bloof Books, 2015)

Fiction
The Empty Quarter (Hanging Loose Press, 2000)
Ordinary Time (Hanging Loose Press, 2005)
Ma Vie a Yonago (Hachette Litteratures, France, 2005)
