= Lydia Tomkiw =

American poet (1959–2007)

Lydia Tomkiw (August 6, 1959 – September 4, 2007) was an American poet, singer, and songwriter, best known for her work with the new wave musical group Algebra Suicide, along with her husband Don Hedeker.

== Early life ==
Lydia Tomkiw was born in Chicago's Humboldt Park neighborhood in 1959, to Ukrainian immigrants Zenovia and Teodor Tomkiw. Her father worked at US Steel, her mother in a succession of retail jobs. By 1975, gang violence and crime in Humboldt Park had become untenable and the family moved to an apartment in Ukrainian Village, a vibrant hub of the émigré community. Tomkiw's creativity and aptitude secured her a spot to study art at the selective Lane Technical High School.

During these years Tomkiw wrote constantly – journaling, writing stories and poems. These proclivities alerted her early to poetry's influence and pull, and in particular, she developed an affection for the idiosyncratic Victorian poet Gerard Manley Hopkins. (Coincidentally, Hopkins would prefigure many of Tomkiw's qualities as a poet. He first set out to be a painter, turned to poetry that was characterized by striking imagery, conversational language, and formal playfulness; his sister Grace would set many of his poems to music.) But these were early, furtive forays and Tomkiw remained mainly inclined toward the visual arts.

In 1977, Tomkiw enrolled as an art major at University of Illinois at Chicago Circle, which boasted a rigorous and extremely competitive art program. Once there, however, she almost immediately found herself outclassed by other students. Her imagination often outpaced her skills, which stubbornly remained decent, but unexceptional. Tomkiw quickly grew frustrated, she began to reassess her creative practice.

Along with her art classes, Tomkiw took poetry classes taught by Maxine Chernoff, then a rising poet, fiction writer, and literary magazine editor. In Chernoff's class, Tomkiw underwent something of a conversion experience, embracing poetry as her primary vehicle of creative expression. She was particularly exhilarated by the performative possibility in poetry – she wrote to be read and she spoke to be heard. Inspired and guided by Chernoff, she quickly distinguished herself as a precocious and promising poet. In early 1978, while still a freshman, Tomkiw bundled together an early cache of poems and self-published them in a chapbook titled Ballpoint Erection. A year later, Tomkiw gathered another nineteen poems and self-published her second chapbook, Obsessions.

By the end of Tomkiw's first year at UIC, Chernoff suggested she transfer to Columbia College Chicago, a small liberal arts college with a long-standing focus on art, performance, and media. In particular, Chernoff thought Tomkiw would flourish under the tutelage of her husband, Paul Hoover, who served as poet-in-residence and taught a highly respected poetry workshop for undergraduates.

Tomkiw arrived at Columbia College in 1978 and fell in with an emerging group of predominantly female poets centered around Hoover's workshops. His first breakout student, Elaine Equi, was followed by a core group that came to include Connie Deanovich, Deborah Pintonelli, Sue Greenspan, Karen Murai, Lorri Jackson, and Sharon Mesmer.

== Poetry and music ==
At the time, the poetry scene was connected to Chicago's punk rock scene. Practicality influenced the approach to art, focusing on craft and expression rather than fashion and style.

Punk and poetry also shared many of the same venues, bars, and clubs. Bars like O'Banion's, Tut's, and Lucky Number all hosted readings in between punk shows by locals like DA, Tutu and the Pirates, and Naked Raygun, and touring acts like the Dead Kennedys, TSOL, and Hüsker Dü.

Within a year, Tomkiw became active in both the punk and poetry scenes, where she connected with fellow creators and found an audience. She lived at home, attended school, and worked various low-wage jobs. During this time, she participated in the local nightlife, wrote prolifically, frequented bookstores and record stores, and spent her earnings on poetry and punk music.

In April 1980, Tomkiw and Sharon Mesmer, by now best friends and poetic accomplices, staged their first reading at the Paul Waggoner Gallery in Chicago. Later that summer, Tomkiw went to see a band called Trouble Boys at Jamie's Elsewhere Lounge. After the show, she struck up a conversation with their guitarist, Don Hedeker. They hit it off and she invited Hedeker to come to a reading she was giving a few weeks later. Soon, Hedeker was smitten, their romance flourished, and they moved in together later that summer. On Halloween of 1981 they were married, with Mesmer as Tomkiw's maid of honor.

While still self-publishing, Tomkiw was also submitting her work. It began to be published regularly, by small regional and literary presses like Another Chicago Magazine, Thunder Egg, Hair Trigger, Wormwood Review, and Permafrost. And by the end of the year she had gathered her latest suite of poems into her first perfect-bound collection, entitled Popgun Sonatas.

One of her distant contributions left a great impact on the British poet Martin Stannard, who, since 1978, had started publishing an occasional review named Joe Soap’s Canoe. For Martin Stannard, Tomkiw became a kindred spirit and was associated with him via his Joe Soap’s Canoe for the next twelve years.

== Formation of Algebra Suicide ==
In the fall of 1982, at a reading at Columbia Squires, Hedeker publicly accompanied Tomkiw's poetry for the first time. It was a rudimentary setup, with Hedeker providing minimally amplified washes of sound on a somewhat glitchy Vox Guitar Organ. This experiment soon coalesced into an actual band. Their name, Algebra Suicide, came from a line in the poem "Recalling the Last Encounter." It was, from the very beginning, envisioned as a vehicle for Tomkiw's poetry; Hedeker's intention was to bring interesting accents and color to the poems themselves.

Tomkiw and Hedeker formed the label, Buzzerama Records, and in the winter of 1982 released their first 7-inch EP True Romance At The World's Fair. Algebra Suicide's first public performance was Labor Day evening 1983 at the West End Club. The song "True Romance at the World's Fair" was selected by the New York-based new wave magazine Trouser Press for inclusion on its trailblazing 1983 compilation, The Best of America Underground.

Tomkiw and Hedeker spent the better part of that year developing and recording new work. Shows were infrequent; they viewed performances much more as special events than as part of a regular gigging schedule. In 1984, Algebra Suicide released its second EP, An Explanation for That Flock of Crows.

Momentum and interest were gathering behind Algebra Suicide and crucially for Tomkiw's identity as a poet, nearly all the critics recognized the fundamental poetic aspect of the project. Tomkiw was regularly credited as a burgeoning, successful poet and the nature of the songs as poems was central to critical appreciation of the band.

In 1985, Algebra Suicide released their debut album, Big Skin, on the label Cause and Effect. Its format represented the firmly dual nature of Algebra Suicide – a cassette of thirteen songs paired with a chapbook presenting thirteen poems in the same running order.

Algebra Suicide began booking performances beyond the Chicago circuit, playing in Milwaukee, Lexington, Cincinnati, and Pittsburgh, with favorable reviews accumulating in alternative magazines like Trouser Press and Option. Tomkiw continued to write prolifically, but chapbooks yielded to records and singles, and by 1986, Algebra Suicide had become the primary vehicle for publishing her poetry.

In 1987, the band released The Secret Like Crazy on the Massachusetts-based label RRRecords and in Europe on the West German Dom Elchklang imprint, essentially becoming Algebra Suicide's international debut. Shortly after, another German label, Pursuit of Market Share, released a live recording from a performance at Chicago's Links Hall entitled Real Numbers.

== Appearance in Best American Poetry 1988 ==
Meanwhile, Tomkiw's written poetry got a sudden boost when her palindromic poem "Six of Ox Is" was included in 1987's New American Writing, an annual anthology emphasizing contemporary American poetry. That led, a year later, to the poem's inclusion in the first volume of The Best American Poetry, founded by poet and editor David Lehman who tapped John Ashbery as its inaugural editor.

A year later, Tomkiw's UK debut poetry collection, The Dreadful Swimmers, was published by Wide Skirt Press, an independent imprint and literary magazine run by poet Geoff Hattersley, that had already published more than twenty of Tomkiw's poems.

== The end of Algebra Suicide ==
In 1989, Algebra Suicide received a Chicago Artists Abroad Grant to perform overseas in Europe in the fall of 1990. Tomkiw and Hedeker booked a tour that took them through Munich, Cologne, Paris, Bordeaux, Louvain, and Zurich. The tour was a huge success. Preceded by strong reviews and advance buzz, the shows were packed, audiences rapt and appreciative. In May 1991, Tomkiw got another Chicago Artists Abroad Grant, this time supporting her endeavors as a traditional poet. She flew to London to join Stannard, Hattersley, and Paul Violi on a short reading tour of the UK. In November 1991, Tomkiw booked a return tour of Europe for Algebra Suicide with stops in Paris, Bordeaux, Nancy, Cologne, and Berlin. But this tour was markedly different. Audiences were sparer, the press less attentive.

Spooked and uncertain, the couple returned stateside and resumed work on their third record. Algebra Suicide held a live show at Club Lower Links with a contest to name it; the winning name, Swoon, was contributed by the club's doorman. Swoon was expanded into a double album on CD with the addition of the prior, European only, album Alpha Cue. The record was released in 1992 in the US by Widely Distributed Records and in Europe by Body Records. The band returned to New York that summer for the 1992 New Music Seminar and Tomkiw participated in a reading curated by Richard Hell at the Poetry Project at St. Mark's Church.

But something was very wrong. Never a band calibrated to mass tastes, Algebra Suicide found appreciation fickle. And Tomkiw's inattention to cultivating her place in the contemporary poetry scene left her loosely rooted and poorly established. Tomkiw became frustrated and resentful and as things began to unravel, she began to drink, heavily. Tensions between Hedeker and Tomkiw quickly escalated and in February 1993, the couple separated. Amidst the disintegration of their marriage and band, they recorded their last, and arguably finest record, Tongue Wrestling. That summer, Hedeker and Tomkiw finally divorced and Algebra Suicide was definitively over.

== Later years and death ==
In the summer of 1993, Tomkiw began work on setting a new group of poems to music. She retained the same basic template as Algebra Suicide, but employed various collaborators and producers, including members of Sosumi, Reality Scare, Martin Bowes of Attrition, and Edward Ka-Spel of the Legendary Pink Dots. The resulting record, Incorporated, while not far removed from her work in Algebra Suicide, broadened the sonic palette in interesting ways, inflecting her poetic delivery with fresh industrial, techno, and ambient touches. Tomkiw bid farewell to Chicago with a 1994 show at the Lounge Ax, focused exclusively on the material from Incorporated. Immediately after, Tomkiw moved to New York City.

Initially there was a sense of renewed momentum. She began booking readings and making connections in the New York contemporary poetry circuit falling in with the Unbearables, a circle of downtown writers and artists founded by Ron Kolm and Bart Plantenga. Incorporated was getting exposure on WFMU, and Tomkiw organized an East Coast record release party at the Knitting Factory. However, finding it arduous and discouraging to plug into the insular, tightly knit world of New York City bohemia, Tomkiw's efforts began to sputter and she quickly soured.

In 2004, after a period of aimlessness, false starts & dissipation, Tomkiw's widowed mother asked her daughter to join her in Sun City, Arizona, where she now lived. Her years in Arizona were troubled and chaotic, the details and particulars largely lost, and Tomkiw and her work faded from view. In September 2007, at age forty-eight, she died of natural causes in her apartment in Phoenix. She was laid to rest in the mausoleum at the Saint Nicholas Ukrainian Catholic Cemetery in Chicago.

== Published work ==
In 2020 all of Tomkiw's poetry was re-issued as Lydia Tomkiw Poems, by Universal Exports of North America. This collection presents all of her publications in facsimile editions, and gathers together more than 180 uncollected poems, accounting for all her Algebra Suicide releases as well as Incorporated, her final solo work. It features an introduction by Paul Hoover, a recollection by Sharon Mesmer, and a consideration of Algebra Suicide by music critic/Trouser Press editor Ira Robbins.

=== Poetry collections ===
- Ballpoint Erection (1978, MOD Distributors)
- Obsessions (1979, MOD Distributors)
- Popgun Sonatas (1980, MOD Distributors)
- Big Skin (1986, Cause and Effect)
- Dreadful Swimmers (1989 Wide Skirt Press)

(all titles out of print)

=== Poems featured in ===
The Best American Poetry 1988, New American Writing, Walk on the Wild Side: Urban American Poetry Since 1974, joe soap's canoe, Unbearables Anthology, Aerial, Brooklyn Review, B-City, The Santa Monica Review, Thunder Egg, Hair Trigger, The Wormwood Review

== Discography ==
In 2013 Dark Entries Records issued Feminine Squared, an 18 track compilation that collects all 8 songs from the first two EPs, 4 songs from the Big Skin cassette, 4 songs from "The Secret Like Crazy", a song from the Pas De Deux compilation, and a previously unreleased song.

In 2019 they released Still Life a 16 track compilation that collects the 9 remaining songs from Big Skin, 3 songs from The Secret Like Crazy, and 4 songs from various compilations.

=== As Algebra Suicide ===
- True Romance at the Worlds EP, Buzzerama Records, 1982
- An Explanation for That Flock of Crows EP, Buzzerama Records, 1985
- Little Dead Bodies EP, Buzzerama Records, 1986
- Big Skin, Cause and Effect, 1986
- The Secret Like Crazy, RRRecords, Dom Elchklang, 1987
- Real Numbers (live), Pursuit of Market Share, 1988
- Alpha Cue, Body Records, 1990
- Swoon. Body Records, 1991
- Tongue Wrestling, Widely Distributed Records, 1994
- Summer Virus Night (live), Dom Elchklang, 2009

==== Compilations ====
- Trouser Press Presents The Best Of America Underground (1983, ROIR)
- Insane Music For Insane People Vol. 6 (1984, Insane Music)
- On-Slaught No. 4 (1984, Idiosyncratics)
- Testube Cassettezine A (1984, Testube)
- Pursuit Of Happiness (1984, Sound Of Pig)
- The History Of Jazz (1984, L'Agence Des Refusés)
- Pas De Deux (1985, Auxilio De Cientos)
- Insane Music For Insane People Vol. 7 (1985, Insane Music)
- Die Orgasmus Bigband (1985, Priapismus Records)
- Independent World Vol. 2 (1985, Monochrome Tapes)
- Testube Cassettezine E (1985, Testube)
- Scream - Sampler Containing Really Exciting American Music (1985, Thirsty Ear)
- The Long March (1985, Sound Of Pig)
- Heat From The Wind Chill Factory (1985, Dead Bunny Records)
- Transient Sonic Stimulants (1986, ZH27)
- Obscure Independent Classics: Volume 3 (1986, Cordelia Records)
- A Concrete Sense (1987, Klappstuhl Records)
- Desperately Seeking Suicide (1987, Priapismus Records)
- Just A Love Song (1987, Old Europa Cafe)
- The Melting Plot (1988, SST Records)
- Berlincassette 2-88 (1988, Jarmusic)
- Heroes To Ecstasy (1988, Strength Through Awareness)
- Sonic Exhibition 2 (1990, NOP International)
- Rehearsal For Retirement (1992, Widely Distributed Records)
- Noise And Fury (2011, Pit Pony)
- Chicago Grotesque (2013, WFMU)
- Autumn Rendezvous (2017, Not On Label)
- Finger Foods Volume 2 (2018, Discontinuous Innovation Inc.)
- The Wire Tapper 50 (2019, Wire Magazine)
- We Will Bury You - Female New Wave / Punk 1977-'82 (Not On Label)
- Outward Inward #4 (SSS Productions)
- Live Vol. I (MB5)

=== As Lydia Tomkiw ===
- Incorporated (1995, Widely Distributed Records)

(all titles out of print)
