= Iconograph =

Picture formed of letters or words

A word iconograph of the initials "VDC" as an eye.

An iconograph is a picture formed by a word or words. It can take the form of irregularly shaped letters or (especially in the case of poems) irregularly aligned text.

American poet May Swenson popularized such poems in her 1970 book Iconographs, which contained a number of poems laid out to resemble their subjects (e.g. a butterfly).
