= Craig Morgan Teicher =

American poet (born 1979)

- Born: 1979 (age 46–47)
- Education: Columbia University
- Alma mater: Bates College, BA
- Spouse: Brenda Shaughnessy
- Writing career
- Notable work: The Trembling Answers
- Notable awards: Lenore Marshall Poetry Prize
- Website: www.craigmorganteicher.com

Craig Morgan Teicher (born 1979) is an American author, poet and literary critic. His poetry collection, The Trembling Answers, won the Lenore Marshall Poetry Prize in 2018. He currently lives in New Jersey.

== Biography ==
Teicher was born in New York in 1979. He studied at Bates College, where he received a BA, and at Columbia University where he received an MFA in 2005.

His poetry collection, The Trembling Answers, won the Lenore Marshall Poetry Prize in 2018. He is the author of two other poetry collections, Brenda is in the Other Room and Other Poems, published in 2008, winner of the Colorado Poetry Prize and To Keep Love Blurry, published in 2012. In 2010, Teicher published the prose collection, Cradle Book: Stories and Fables, and in 2014, the chapbook, Ambivalence and Other Conundrums. His debut collection of essays, We Begin in Gladness, was published by Graywolf Press in 2018.

Teicher is the director of digital operations at The Paris Review and is a poetry editor of The Literary Review. Teicher lives in Verona, New Jersey, with his wife, the poet Brenda Shaughnessy, and their children.

== Awards ==
- Colorado Poetry Prize, 2007
- Lenore Marshall Poetry Prize, 2018

== Bibliography ==
=== Poetry ===
==== Collections and chapbooks ====
- Brenda Is in the Other Room and Other Poems, (Center for Literary Publishing, 2008)
- To Keep Love Blurry (BOA Editions, 2012)
- Ambivalence and Other Conundrums, (Omnidawn, 2014), chapbook
- The Trembling Answers (BOA Editions, 2017)

==== List of poems ====
Year	Title	First published	Reprinted/collected
2021	"Peers"	Teicher, Craig Morgan (April 5, 2021). "Peers". The New Yorker. 97 (7): 35.	

=== Prose ===
- Cradle Book (BOA Editions, 2010)
- We Begin in Gladness, (Graywolf Press, 2018)
