= Sulfur (magazine) =

Sulfur: A Literary Tri-Annual of the Whole Art was an influential, small literary magazine founded by American poet and award-winning translator Clayton Eshleman in 1981 while he was Dreyfuss Poet in Residence at the California Institute of Technology.

The name Sulfur references sulphur, a butterfly with orange and yellow wings, bordered in black, as well as the element sulfur in particular in its role in alchemical processes of combustion and transformation. By referencing a butterfly in the title, Eshleman linked the magazine with Caterpillar a previous magazine he founded and edited from 1967 to 1973. By linking the magazine with alchemy, Eshleman was also associating it with Jungian interpretations of alchemical symbols. In a note on the term published in Sulfur 24, Eshleman evoked "imagination as an instrument of change."

Sulfur appeared three times a year from 1981 to 1987 and two times a year from 1988 until its final double issue number 45 / 46 in Spring 2000. Its roughly 11,000 pages included writing and visual art from some 800 contributors, 200 of which were not from the United States.

In addition to poetry and prose by American poets, Eshleman pursued five other principal areas of focus for the magazine:

1. Translations of contemporary foreign-language poets and new translations of untranslated older works.
2. Archival materials by earlier Anglophone writers.
3. Including writings by unknown, typically younger writers in every issue.
4. Commentary including poetics, notes, and book reviews, occasionally polemical in nature.
5. Resource materials including writing from outside of poetry per se.

== History ==
The magazine was founded following a discussion between Eshleman, Robert Kelly and Jerome Rothenberg. "Sulfur unswervingly presented itself as an alternative to what some of us call 'official verse culture' (backed by The New York Times Book Review, The New York Review of Books, The New Yorker, The Nation, and nearly all trade publishing houses, to the exclusion of contrasting viewpoints)," Eshleman said in an interview when the magazine closed.

The magazine was funded by sales and subscriptions as well as grants from academic and public institutions. The Humanities Division of the California Institute of Technology funded the magazine from 1981 to 1983. The UCLA Extension Writers Program funded issues 10 through 15, from 1984 to 1986. From 1986 to 2000, the English Department at Eastern Michigan University provided limited office support, a part-time graduate assistant, and course release time for Eshleman (then a professor of poetry there). Grants from the National Endowment for the Arts from the mid-1980s until 1996, alongside sales and subscriptions, covered expenses during that period.

During its run of issues, Sulfur maintained a reputation as the premiere publication of alternative and experimental writing. This was due in no small measure to its impressive masthead of contributing editors and correspondents. These included Rachel Blau DuPlessis, Michael Palmer, and Eliot Weinberger as "Contributing Editors". The roster of "Correspondents" included: Charles Bernstein, James Clifford, Clark Coolidge, Jayne Cortez, Marjorie Perloff, Jed Rasula, Jerome Rothenberg, Roberto Tejada, Keith Tuma, Allen S. Weiss, and Marjorie Welish. The managing editor was Clayton Eshleman's wife, Caryl Eshleman.

Issue 33 (Fall 1993) was a special issue entitled Into the Past, edited by Eliot Weinberger. Issue 44 (Spring 1999) was a special issue entitled Anglophone Poetry & Poetics Outside the US and the UK, guest edited by Jenny Penberthy and Marjorie Perloff.

The final issue of Sulfur appeared in spring 2000. In his introduction, Eshleman explained the end of the magazine by citing the ongoing financial challenge of producing a poetry magazine without solid institutional or public support as well as, more significantly, the fact that he wanted to devote more of his time to his own writing.

In 2008, Jacket magazine published a conversation between Clayton Eshleman, Paul Hoover, and Maxine Chernoff on editing Sulfur and New American Writing.Jacket 36

Wesleyan University Press published A Sulfur Anthology edited by Clayton Eshleman in December 2015.

== Testimonials ==
Gary Snyder: In an era of literary conservation and sectarianism, the broad commitment of Sulfur to both literary excellence and broad, interdisciplinary, unbought humanistic engagement with the art of poetry in America has been invaluable. To my notion its critical articles and notes have been the sharpest going over the last several years.

James Laughlin: Sulfur must be the most important literary magazine which has explored and extended the boundaries of poetry. Clayton Eshleman has a nose for smelling out what was going to happen next in the ceaseless evolution of the living art.

George Butterick: Sulfur is Antaeus with a risk. It has efficacy. It has primacy. It is one of the few magazines that is more than a receptacle of talent, actually contributing to the shape of present-day literary engagement.

Marjorie Perloff: Sulfur has been, throughout the 80s and 90s, the very best journal for cutting-edge writing, whether poetry or fiction or criticism. It surpasses the others by not being the organ or mouthpiece of a little clique but bringing together disparate items in an inspired collage.

Charles Bernstein: Much attention has been paid to Sulfur's selection of poetry, which included work from many unknown and new poets as well as old hands. But equally important was the back section of the magazine, which offered some of the most incisive commentary of the state of the art available, dwarfing the coverage in almost any other venue.

Eliot Weinberger: It's undeniable that everywhere – and especially in the United States, where literary writers generally do not appear in newspapers or mass-circulation periodicals – the ‘little’ magazine kept literature alive in the 20th century. And it is safe to say that Sulfur was the last significant American little magazine of the century.
