= Brenda Shaughnessy =

American poet (born 1970)

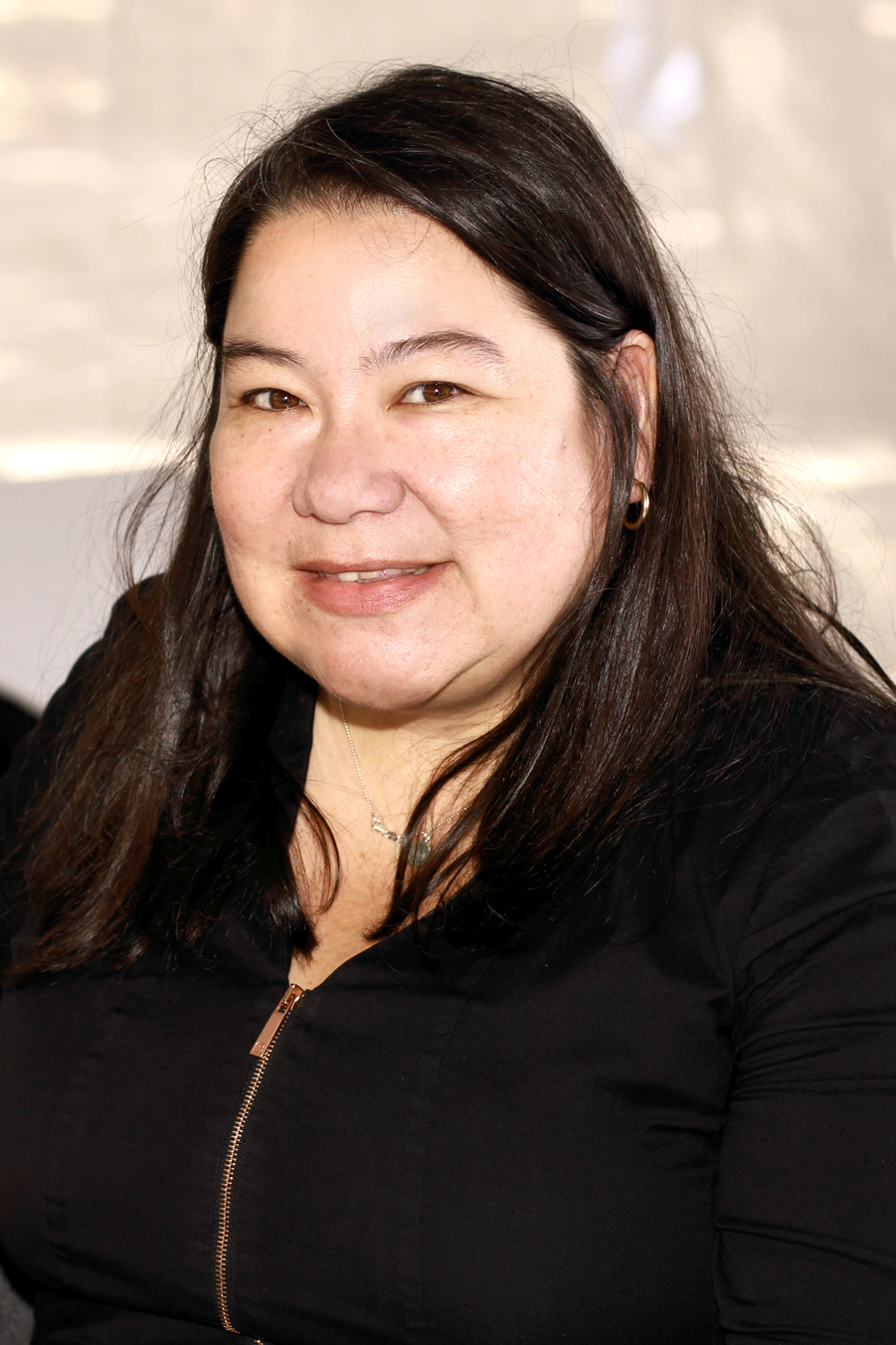
- Shaughnessy in 2019
- Born: 1970 (age 55–56); Okinawa Island, USCAR
- Education: University of California, Santa Cruz; Columbia University
- Writing career
- Language: English

Brenda Shaughnessy (born 1970) is an Asian American poet most known for her poetry books Our Andromeda and So Much Synth. Her book, Our Andromeda, was named a Library Journal "Book of the Year," one of The New York Times's "100 Best Books of 2013." Additionally, The New York Times and Publishers Weekly named So Much Synth as one of the best poetry collections of 2016. Shaughnessy works as an associate professor of English in the MFA Creative Writing program at Rutgers University–Newark.

== Life ==
Shaughnessy was born in Okinawa and grew up in Southern California. She received her BA in literature and women's studies at the University of California, Santa Cruz and MFA at Columbia University.

Her poems have appeared in Best American Poetry, BOMB, Conjunctions, McSweeney's, The New Yorker, The Paris Review, The Yale Review, and elsewhere. Our Andromeda (2012) was selected as a Library Journal "Book of the Year" and as one of the "100 Best Books of 2013" by The New York Times as well as being shortlisted for both the 2013 PEN/Open Book Award and the 2013 International Griffin Poetry Prize. So Much Synth was published in 2016 by Copper Canyon Press and was named one of the best poetry collections of 2016 by The New York Times and Publishers Weekly. Her fifth book of poems, The Octopus Museum, was published by Knopf in 2019.

She is an associate professor of English in the MFA program at Rutgers-Newark. She lives in Verona, New Jersey with her husband, the poet and editor Craig Morgan Teicher, and their children.

== Awards ==
- 2018 Literature Award from the American Academy of Arts and Letters.
- Our Andromeda, shortlisted for the 2013 International Griffin Poetry Prize and the 2013 PEN/Open Book Award.
- Human Dark with Sugar, winner of the James Laughlin Award from the Academy of American Poets, finalist for National Book Critics Circle award
- Interior with Sudden Joy, which was nominated for the PEN/Joyce Osterweil Award for Poetry, a Lambda Literary Award, and the Norma Farber First Book Award.
- Bunting Fellowship at the Radcliffe Institute for Advanced Study at Harvard University
- Japan/U.S. Friendship Commission Artist Fellowship.

== Bibliography ==
=== Poetry ===
Collections

- So Much Synth. Copper Canyon Press. 2016. ISBN 978-1-55659-487-8.
- Our Andromeda. Copper Canyon Press. 2012. ISBN 978-1-55659-410-6.
- Human Dark with Sugar. Copper Canyon Press. 2008. ISBN 978-1-55659-276-8.
- Interior with Sudden Joy. Farrar, Straus and Giroux. 2000. ISBN 978-0-374-52698-6.
- The Octopus Museum. Knopf. 2019. ISBN 978-0-525-65565-7.
- Tanya. Knopf. March 7, 2023. ISBN 978-0-593-53593-6.

Anthologies

- David Lehman, ed. (2008). "Voluptuary". The Best American Erotic Poems. Simon and Schuster. ISBN 978-1-4165-3746-5.
- Michael Dumanis; Mark Doty; Cate Marvin, eds. (2006). Legitimate dangers: American poets of the new century. Sarabande Books. ISBN 978-1-932511-29-1.
- Rita Dove; Robert Bly; David Lehman, eds. (2000). The Best American Poetry 2000. Scribner. ISBN 978-0-684-84281-3.
- Victoria M. Chang, ed. (2004). Asian American poetry: the next generation. University of Illinois Press. ISBN 978-0-252-07174-4.
- Brenda Shaughnessy, ed. (2008). Satellite Convulsions: Poems from Tin House. Tin House Books. ISBN 978-0-9794198-9-8.

List of poems

Title	Year	First published	Reprinted/collected
I'm over the moon	2005	Shaughnessy, Brenda (October 1, 2005). "Three poems". BOMB Magazine. 93.	
Three summers mark only two years	2005	Shaughnessy, Brenda (October 1, 2005). "Three poems". BOMB Magazine. 93.	
Straight's the new gay	2005	Shaughnessy, Brenda (October 1, 2005). "Three poems". BOMB Magazine. 93.	
I have a time machine	2015	Shaughnessy, Brenda (July 20, 2015). "I have a time machine". The New Yorker. 91 (20): 46–47.	
Too hot can't stop	2022	Shaughnessy, Brenda (September 5, 2022). "Too hot can't stop". The New Yorker. 98 (27): 42.	

- "I'm Over the Moon". poets.org. The New School, Tishman Auditorium. October 19, 2007.
- "Why is the Color of Snow?". poets.org.
- "What's Uncanny; Fortune; Mistress Formika; Project for a Fainting". The Boston Review. December 1998 – January 1999. Archived from the original on July 12, 2009.
- "Me in Paradise". Nerve. July 2000.
- "Dear Gonglya; Your One Good Dress". Salon. April 5, 2001. Archived from the original on October 19, 2000.
- "Epithalament", Fort.org
