= Marjorie Welish =

American poet and artist (born 1944)

- Born: 1944 (age 81–82)
- Education: Columbia University, Vermont College, Norwich University
- Website: marjoriewelish.com

Marjorie Welish (/ˈwɛlɪʃ/ WELL-ish; born June 2, 1944) is an American poet, artist, and art critic.

Welish is a graduate of Columbia University and received her M.F.A. degree from Vermont College and Norwich University. She also studied at the Art Students League of New York.

She lives in New York City and teaches art and literary criticism and art history at Pratt Institute; she has also frequently taught poetry at Brown University. Welish was the Judith E. Wilson Visiting Poetry Fellow at Cambridge University in 2005.

Welish's The Annotated 'Here' and Selected Poems was a finalist for the Lenore Marshall Prize from the Academy of American Poets. Her writing on art has appeared in Art in America, Art International, Art News, BOMB (magazine), Partisan Review, and Salmagundi.

A collection of her art criticism came out in 1999 entitled, Signifying Art: Essays on Art after 1960.

In April 2001, a conference at the University of Pennsylvania was held to compile Of the Diagram: The Work of Marjorie Welish (Cambridge University Press), a retrospective collection of papers and presentations given on her work, as well as a selection of Welish's writing and painting.

She has received grants and fellowships from the Adolph and Esther Gottlieb Foundation, the Djerassi Foundation, the Elizabeth Foundation for the Arts, Fifth Floor Foundation, the Howard Foundation, the International Studio Program, the MacDowell Colony Fellowship, Pollock-Krasner Foundation, and the Trust for Mutual Understanding.

Welish serves on the board of the International Studio & Curatorial Program (ISCP).

== Bibliography ==
- A Complex Sentence (Coffee House Press, 2021)
- So What So That (Coffee House Press, 2016)
- In the Futurity Lounge (Coffee House Press, 2012)
- Isle of the Signatories (Coffee House Press, 2008)
- Word Group (Coffee House Press, 2004)
- Of the Diagram: The Work of Marjorie Welish (Slought Foundation, 2003)
- The Annotated "Here" and Selected Poems (Coffee House Press, 2000)
- "Signifying Art: Essays on Art after 1960" (Cambridge University Press, 1999)
- Casting Sequences (University of Georgia Press, 1993)
- The Windows Flew Open (Burning Deck, 1991)
- Two Poems (Z Press, 1981)
- Handwritten (Sun Press, 1979).

Welish's poems have been anthologized in:

- Best American Poetry 1988 (edited by John Ashbery)
- Experimental Poetry in America 1950 to the Present: A Norton Anthology (Sun and Moon Press 1994)
- From the Other Side of the Century: New American Poetry 1960–1990 (1994)
- Moving Borders: Three Decades of Innovative Writing by Women (1998)
