= New American Writing =

American literary magazine

- Editors: Paul Hoover; Maxine Chernoff
- Categories: Literary magazine
- Frequency: Annual
- Founded: 1986; 39 years ago
- Company: OINK! Press
- Country: United States
- Language: English
- Website: newamericanwriting.com
- ISSN: 0893-7842

New American Writing is an annual American literary magazine emphasizing contemporary American poetry, including a range of innovative contemporary writing. New American Writing is published by OINK! Press, a nonprofit organization. The magazine appears in early June each year. It was first published in 1986.

== Editors ==
The publication is edited by poets Paul Hoover, editor of Postmodern American Poetry, and Maxine Chernoff.

== Contributors ==
John Ashbery, Robert Creeley, Charles Simic, Jorie Graham, Denise Levertov, Hilda Morley, August Kleinzahler, Ann Lauterbach, Ned Rorem, Wanda Coleman, Nathaniel Mackey, Barbara Guest, Marjorie Perloff, Michael Palmer, Lyn Hejinian, and Charles Bernstein.

== Cover art ==
Each issue of the magazine features cover art by leading artists, including Alex Katz, Robert Mapplethorpe, Jennifer Bartlett, Elizabeth Murray, and Fairfield Porter.

== Other anthologies ==
Work from the magazine has appeared in the annual The Best American Poetry series and also in the annual Pushcart Anthology.

== Special issues ==
- Supplement of Australian poetry edited by John Tranter (No. 4)
- Censorship and the Arts (No. 5)
- Supplement of innovative poetry from Great Britain edited by Ric Caddel
- Supplement of Brazilian poetry edited by Régis Bonvicino (No. 18)

== See also ==
- List of literary magazines
