= Paul Hoover (poet) =

American poet and editor (born 1946)

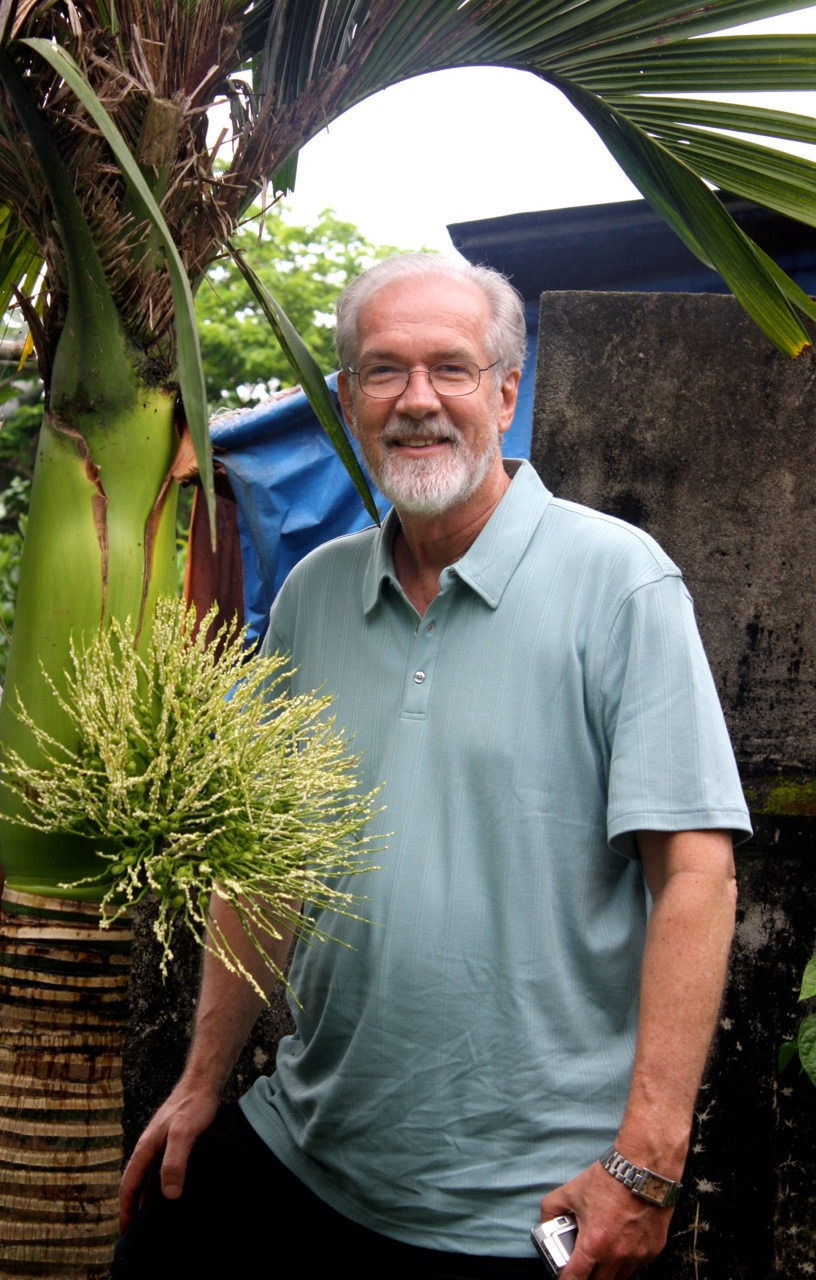
Paul Hoover at Dong Thai Village, Hatinh, Vietnam, 2011

Paul Hoover (born 1946) is an American poet and editor born in Harrisonburg, Virginia.

His work has been associated with innovative practices such as; New York School and language poetry.

After many years as poet in residence at Columbia College Chicago, he accepted the position of Professor of Creative Writing at San Francisco State University in 2003. He lives in Mill Valley, California.

He is widely known as editor, with Maxine Chernoff, of the literary magazine New American Writing, published once a year in association with San Francisco State University. He is also known for editing the anthology Postmodern American Poetry, 1994. A second edition of the anthology was published in 2013.

Hoover wrote the script for the 1994 independent film Viridian, directed by Joseph Ramirez, which was screened at The Film Center of the Art Institute of Chicago and the Hamburg Film Festival.

He served as curator of a poetry series at the DeYoung Museum of Art in San Francisco from 2007 to 2011. The series' first season Michael Palmer, Anne Carson, and Robert Hass; its final season featured the conceptual poets Kenneth Goldsmith and Vanessa Place and the Mexican poets Maria Baranda and Coral Bracho, winners of the distinguished Aguascalientes Prize.

Hoover was a founding board member and former president of the independent poetry reading series, "The Poetry Center at School of the Art Institute of Chicago," which celebrated its 30th anniversary in 2004.

His poetry has appeared in the literary magazines American Poetry Review, Triquarterly, Conjunctions, The Paris Review, Partisan Review, Sulfur, The New Republic, Hambone, and The Iowa Review, among others. It has also appeared in numerous anthologies including six volumes of the annual anthology The Best American Poetry series.

== Awards and honors ==
The Frederick Bock Award for poems that appeared in the June 2010 issue of Poetry; The PEN-USA Translation Award (with Maxine Chernoff) for Selected Poems of Friedrich Holderlin; The Jerome J. Shestack Award for the best poems to appear in American Poetry Review in 2002; The Carl Sandburg Award, Chicago's leading literary prize, for Idea, 1987; The General Electric Foundation Award for Younger Writers, 1984, for poems later included in Nervous Songs; and an NEA Fellowship in poetry, 1980.

== Work ==
Hoover has published fifteen poetry collections, a book of literary essays, and a novel. He has also co-translated three volumes of poetry from German and Vietnamese.

=== Poetry ===
- O and Green, New and Selected Poems Cheshire, MA: MadHat Press, 2021
- En el idioma y en la tierra (In Idiom and Earth), translated into Spanish by Maria Baranda, Mexico City: Conaculta, 2012
- La intencion y su materia (Intention and Its Thing), translated into Spanish by Maria Baranda, Caracas: Monte Avila Editores, 2012
- desolation : souvenir, Richmond, CA: Omnidawn Publishing, 2012
- Sonnet 56, Los Angeles, CA: Les Figues Press, 2009
- Corazón, translated into Spanish by María Baranda, Puebla, MX: LunArena Press, 2009
- Edge and Fold, Berkeley: Apogee Press, 2006
- Poems in Spanish, Richmond, CA: Omnidawn Publishing, 2005, nominated for the Bay Area Book Award
- Winter Mirror, Chicago: Flood Editions, 2002
- Rehearsal in Black, Cambridge, England: Salt Publications, 2001
- Totem and Shadow: New & Selected Poems, Jersey City: Talisman House, 1999
- Viridian, Athens, GA: The University of Georgia Press, 1997, winner of the Contemporary Poetry Series competition
- The Novel: A Poem, New York: New Directions, 1991
- Idea, Great Barrington, MA: The Figures, 1987
- Nervous Songs, Seattle: L'Epervier Press, 1986
- Somebody Talks a Lot, Chicago: The Yellow Press, 1983
- Letter to Einstein Beginning Dear Albert, Chicago: The Yellow Press, 1979

=== Other ===
- The Monocle Thugs (Short Stories). Oink! Press, 1977.
- Fables of Representation (Essays), Ann Arbor: University of Michigan Press, 2004
- Postmodern American Poetry (anthology), New York: W. W. Norton, 1994
- Saigon, Illinois (novel), New York: Vintage Contemporaries, 1988, a chapter of which appeared in The New Yorker

== Translations ==
- Beyond the Court Gate: Selected Poems of Nguyen Trai, edited and translated with Nguyen Do, Denver: Counterpath Press, 2010
- Selected Poems of Friedrich Holderlin, edited and translated with Maxine Chernoff, Richmond, CA: Omnidawn Publishing, 2008
- Black Dog, Black Night: Contemporary Vietnamese Poetry, edited and translated with Nguyen Do, St. Paul: Milkweed Editions, 2008
