= Gerrit Henry =

American art critic, author and poet (1950–2003)

Gerrit Henry (May 30, 1950 in New York City, New York – May 1, 2003 in New York City, New York) was an American art critic, author and poet.

Henry published feature and critical articles in After Dark, Art News, Art in America, The New York Times, The Village Voice, The Los Angeles Times, People Magazine, Art International, The Spectator, and The New Republic. His books include Janet Fish: A Monograph (Burton & Skira, Geneva, 1987), The Mirrored Clubs of Hell: Poems by Gerrit Henry (Little, Brown and Company, 1991), Poems & Ballades (Dolphin, Baltimore, 1998) and Ian Hornak: Reverence and Reverie (Katharina Rich Perlow, Inc. 1999). He is also published in Paris Review, Yale Review and Cover. The Time of the Night, a posthumous collection of his poems edited by Marc Cohen, was published in 2011 by The Groundwater Press. His last project, Climbing the Stairs, a documentary about his life and poetry (with John Ashbery), directed by Neil Grayson (artist) and produced by Dactyl Foundation for the Arts & Humanities, was released in 2004. Henry was an advisory board member and Poetry Series Director at Dactyl Foundation beginning in 1998. He graduated from Columbia College, Columbia University in 1972 with a B.A. in English. He studied poetry under Kenneth Koch. Henry received awards from The Cornell Woolrich Fellowship, Columbia University, The National Endowment for the Arts, the Ann and Erlo Von Waveren Foundation, and NYFA artists' fund. He taught at C.W. Post College on Long Island and Manhattan's and School of Visual Arts.
