= George Bradley (poet) =

American poet (born 1953)

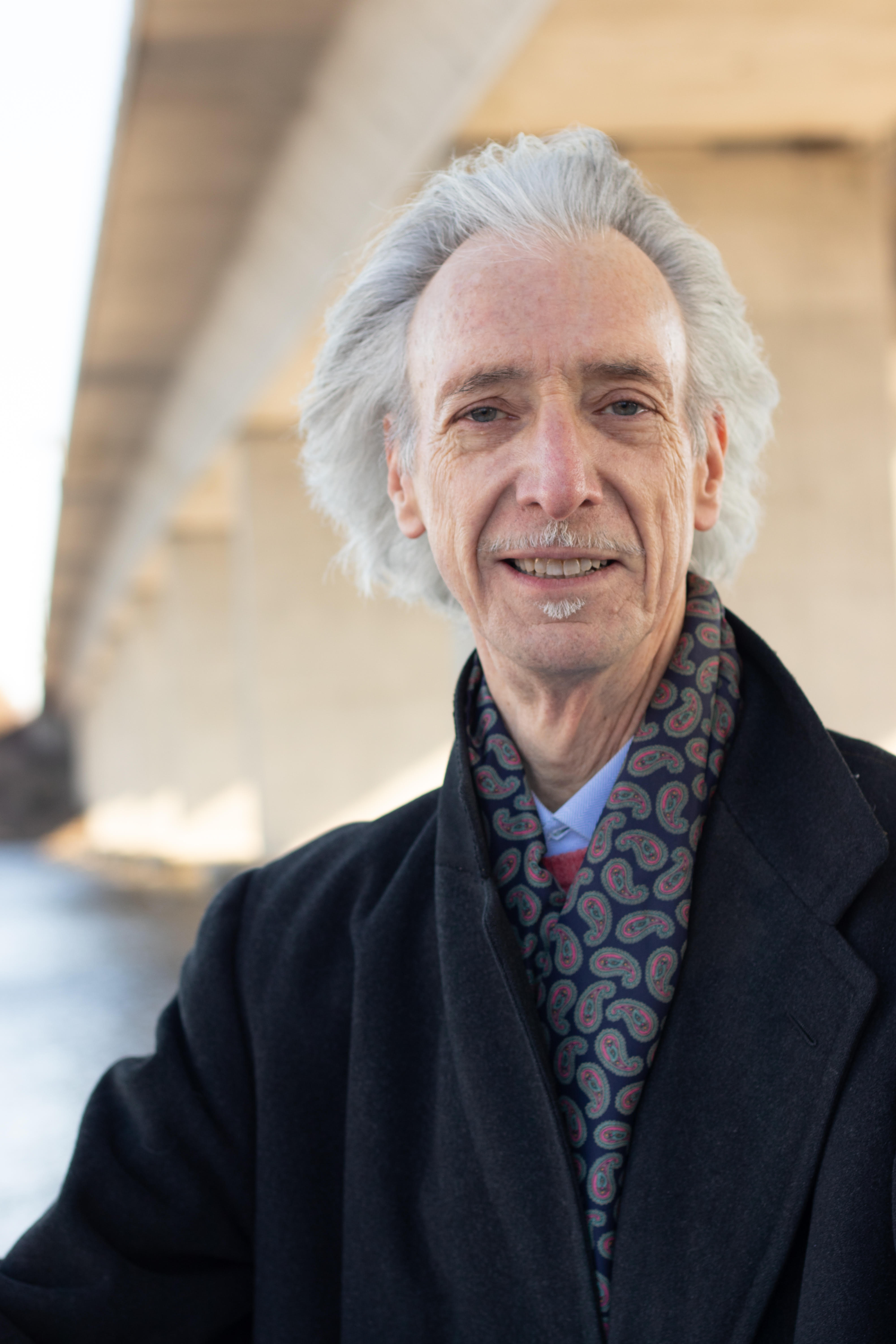
- Born: George Crawford Bradley Jr. January 22, 1953 (age 73); Roslyn, New York, U.S.
- Education: Yale University; University of Virginia
- Occupations: Poet, writer, editor
- Spouse: Spencer Boyd (m. 1984)

George Bradley (born 1953) is an American poet, editor, and fiction writer whose work is characterized by formal structure, humor, and satirical narrative.

== Early life and education ==
Bradley was raised on Long Island and has lived in Virginia, New York City, Italy, and Connecticut and attended The Hill School, Yale University, and the University of Virginia.

== Career ==
He has worked variously in construction, as a sommelier, as an editor and as a copywriter. At present, he imports and distributes a brand of olive oil (La Bontà di Fiesole) produced in Tuscany. He is married to Spencer Boyd, and they have one child, Beatrice Boyd Bradley.

Bradley's poems have appeared in The New Yorker, Poetry, New England Review, The New Republic, The Paris Review, The American Poetry Review, The Hartford Courant, Partisan Review, Southwest Review, America Illustrated, Western Humanities Review, Open City, Shenandoah, Verse (US and UK), Spazio Umano (Italy), Literary Imagination, The American Scholar, Raritan, and Almanacco (Italy) among other publications. Bradley's prose, including fiction and literary criticism, has been published in The Yale Review, Southwest Review, The American Scholar, The Houston Chronicle, and elsewhere.

== Awards ==
- 1985: Yale Younger Poets Series, selected by James Merrill
- 1990: The Peter I. B. Lavan Award from the Academy of American Poets
- 1990: National Endowment for the Arts Grant
- 1992: The Witter Bynner Prize from the American Academy and Institute of Arts and Letters

== Works ==
In 1998 he edited The Yale Younger Poets Anthology, which traced the history of the first poetry series in America from its inception in 1919 to 1997. The critic Peter Davison praised this anthology in the Atlantic Monthly for uncovering an important chapter of American literary history: Bradley "introduces each selection with a brief identification of its author, and prefaces his anthology with introductory matter amounting to nearly a hundred pages of graceful, witty, and discriminating prose that combines aesthetic perception, historical understanding, and publishing shrewdness. The result is a book that illuminates the recesses between artists, audiences, public taste, and the history of American publication."

=== Poetry ===
- The Paradise of Assassins. Alderman Press. 1978.
- Terms To Be Met. Yale University Press. 1986. ISBN 978-0-300-03599-5.
- Of the Knowledge of Good and Evil. A.A. Knopf. 1991. ISBN 978-0394589985.
- The Fire Fetched Down. A.A. Knopf. 1996. ISBN 978-0679446200.
- Some Assembly Required. A.A. Knopf. 2001. ISBN 978-0-375-41195-3.
- A Few of Her Secrets. Waywiser Press (U.K. and U.S.A.). 2011. ISBN 978-1-904130-42-0.
- A Stroll in the Rain, New and Selected Poems. Louisiana State University Press. 2021. ISBN 978-0-8071-7584-2.

=== Memoirs ===
- Carpet Diem: Tales from the World of Oriental Rugs. Harper/HarperCollins. 2025. ISBN 978-0-06-339493-3.

=== Anthologies ===
- Ashbery, John; Lehman, David, eds. (1988). The Best American Poetry 1988. Collier Books. ISBN 978-1-5011-9633-1.
- James, Tate; Lehman, David, eds. (1997). The Best American Poetry 1997. Simon and Schuster. ISBN 978-0-684-81452-0.
- Bradley, George, ed. (1998). The Yale Younger Poets Anthology. Yale University Press. ISBN 978-0-300-07473-4.
- Collins, Billy, ed. (2003). Poetry 180: a turning back to poetry. Random House Trade Paperbacks. ISBN 978-0-8129-6887-3.
- Furman, Laura, ed. (2010). The PEN/O. Henry Prize Stories, The Best Stories of the Year. Anchor Books/Random House. ISBN 978-0-307-47236-6.
- Gioia, Dana; Lehman, David, eds. (2018). The Best American Poetry 2018. Scribner Poetry. ISBN 978-1-5011-2779-3.

=== Translations ===
- Montale, Eugenio (2022). Late Montale: poems written in his final years. Translated by Bradley, George. Waywiser Press. ISBN 978-1-911379-05-8.
