= Maxine Chernoff =

American poet

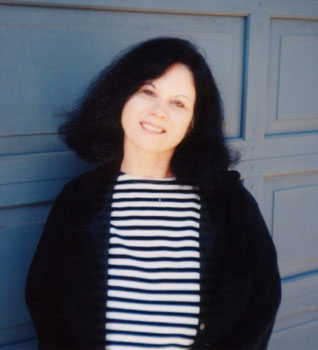
- Maxine Chernoff in front of her house
- Born: 1952 (age 73–74); Chicago, Illinois
- Occupations: Poet; editor; professor; author
- Spouse: Paul Hoover
- Children: Three
- Writing career
- Notable works: American Heaven, Some of Her Friends That Year, Signs of Devotion, Bop, Selected Poems of Friedrich Hölderlin, New American Writing
- Notable awards: 1985 Carl Sanburg Award

Maxine Chernoff (born 1952) is an American novelist, writer, poet, academic and literary magazine editor.

== Biography ==
She was born and raised in Chicago, Illinois, and attended the University of Illinois at Chicago.

Chernoff is a professor and Chair of the Creative Writing program at San Francisco State University. With her husband, Paul Hoover, she edits the long-running literary journal New American Writing. She is the author of six books of fiction and ten books of poetry, including The Turning (2008) and Among the Names (2005), both from Apogee Press.

Chernoff's novel American Heaven and her book of short stories, Some of Her Friends That Year, were finalists for the Bay Area Book Reviewers Award. With Paul Hoover, she has translated The Selected Poems of Friedrich Hölderlin (Omnidawn Press, 2008) which won the 2009 PEN Translation Prize.

As of 2013, she lives in Mill Valley, California.

== Works ==
=== Novels ===
- A Boy in Winter (Crown Publishing, 1999; Harper Flamingo Australia, 2000)
- American Heaven (Coffee House Press, 1996), a finalist for the Bay Area Book

Reviewers Award

- Plain Grief (Summit, 1991; available as e-book from Previewport.com, 2001)

=== Short stories ===
- Some of Her Friends That Year: New & Selected Stories (Coffee House Press, 2002), a finalist for the Bay Area Book Reviewers Award
- Signs of Devotion: (stories) (Simon & Schuster, 1993) a New York Times Book Review Notable Book for 1993.
- Bop, stories (Coffee House Press, 1986; Vintage Contemporaries, 1987)

=== Poetry ===
- Light and Clay: New and Selected Poems (MadHat Press, 2023)
- Under the Music: Collected Prose Poems (MadHat Press, 2019)
- Camera (Subito Press, 2017)
- Here (Counterpath Press, 2014)
- Without (Shearsman, England, 2012)
- A House in Summer (Argotist Press, England, 2012)
- To Be Read in the Dark (Omnidawn, 2011)
- The Turning (Apogee Press, 2008)
- Among the Names (Apogee Press, 2005)
- Evolution of the Bridge: Selected Prose Poems (Salt Publications, 2005)
- World: Poems 1991–2001 (Salt Publications, 2001)
- Leap Year Day: New & Selected Poems (Another Chicago Press, 1990; Jensen Daniels, 1999)
- Japan (Avenue B Press, 1988)
- New Faces of 1952 (Ithaca House, 1985)
- Utopia TV Store (The Yellow Press, 1979)
- A Vegetable Emergency, prose poems (Beyond Baroque Foundation, 1976)
- The Last Aurochs (Now Press, 1976)

=== Editor ===
- Selected Poems of Friedrich Hölderlin, co-translated with Paul Hoover; (Omnidawn, 2008)
- New American Writing (with Paul Hoover), (1986) — present)

== Awards ==
- 1985 Carl Sandburg Award
- 1985 PEN New Books Award
- 1986 Friends of American Writers' Award
- 1986 LSU Southern Review Fiction Award
- 1993 Sun-Times Fiction Prize
- 1988 CCLM Editors' Award
- 2002 Marin Arts Council Fellowship
- 1996 and 2002 BABRA finalist
- 2009 PEN Translation Award
- 5 Illinois Arts Council Fellowships
- 2013 NEA Poetry Fellowship
