= Donald Revell =

American poet

Donald Revell (born 1954 in Bronx, New York) is an American poet, essayist, translator and professor.

Revell has won numerous honors and awards for his work, beginning with his first book, From the Abandoned Cities, which was a National Poetry Series winner. He won the 2004 Lenore Marshall Prize and is a two-time winner of the PEN Center USA Award for Poetry. He has also received the Gertrude Stein Award in Innovative American Poetry, two Jerome J. Shestack Prizes from The American Poetry Review and two Pushcart Prizes, as well as fellowships from the National Endowment for the Arts, the Ingram Merrill Foundation and the Guggenheim Foundation.

His books include From the Abandoned Cities (Harper, 1983), My Mojave (Alice James Books, 2003) and Drought-Adapted Vine (Alice James Books, 2015). He has also published his translation of Arthur Rimbaud's A Season in Hell (Omnidawn Publishing, 2007).

Revell has taught at the Universities of Tennessee, Missouri, Iowa, Alabama, Colorado, Utah and Nevada.

He lives in Las Vegas.

In addition to his writing, translating and teaching, Revell was editor of Denver Quarterly from 1988–94, and has been a poetry editor of Colorado Review since 1996.

Revell received his B.A. in 1975 and his M.A. in 1977 from Binghamton University, and his Ph.D. from the University at Buffalo in 1980.

== Honors and awards ==
- 1985 Pushcart Prize for "A Setting"
- 1988 National Endowment for the Arts Poetry Fellowship
- 1991 PEN Center USA Award for Poetry for New Dark Ages
- 1992 Guggenheim Fellowship in Poetry
- 1995 National Endowment for the Arts Fellowship for Creative Writers
- 2003 PEN Center USA Award for Poetry for Arcady
- 2004 Lenore Marshall Poetry Prize for My Mojave
- 2005 Los Angeles Times Book Prize for Poetry finalist for Pennyweight Windows
- 2005 Silver Pen Award
- 2008 PEN Center USA Award in Translation for A Season in Hell
- 2017 Nevada Writers Hall of Fame

== Published works ==
=== Poetry collections ===
- From the Abandoned Cities (Harper & Row Publishers, 1983)
- The Gaza of Winter (University of Georgia Press, 1988)
- New Dark Ages (Wesleyan University Press, 1990)
- Erasures (Wesleyan University Press, 1992)
- Beautiful Shirt (Wesleyan University Press, 1994)
- There Are Three (Wesleyan University Press, 1998)
- Arcady (Wesleyan University Press, 2002)
- My Mojave (Alice James Books, 2003)
- Pennyweight Windows: New And Selected Poems (Alice James Books, 2005)
- A Thief of Strings (Alice James Books, 2007)
- The Bitter Withy (Alice James Books, 2009)
- Tantivy (Alice James Books, 2012)
- Drought-Adapted Vine (Alice James Books, 2015)
- The English Boat (Alice James Books, 2018)
- White Campion (Alice James Books, 2021)
- Canandaigua (Alice James Books, 2024)

=== Translations ===
- Alcools: Poems by Guillaume Apollinaire (Wesleyan University Press, 1995)
- The Self-Dismembered Man: Selected Later Poems of Guillaume Apollinaire (Wesleyan University Press, 2004)
- A Season in Hell by Arthur Rimbaud (Omnidawn, 2007)
- Last Verses by Jules Laforgue (Omnidawn, 2011)

=== Essay collections ===
- Invisible Green: Selected Prose (Omnidawn, 2005)
- The Art of Attention: A Poet's Eye (Graywolf Press, 2007)

== Reviews ==
In a retrospective review of Revell's work written by Stephanie Burt for The Nation, she comments on Pennyweight Windows: New & Selected Poems: "Revell now seeks a poetry appropriate not only to loneliness but to anger and happiness, not only to freighted symbols but to facts, not only to doubt but to faith. What's more, he seems to have found what he seeks." She also opens her review with a comment about how much Revell's work has changed in twenty years, noting the stylistic evolution and increasingly spiritual focus of Revell's work.

In Time magazine, Lev Grossman wrote about Pennyweight Windows:

It takes guts to write more poems about peace, war, God and children, but Revell's are so fresh, it's as if he's the first person ever to do it. He makes you feel how painfully near grace and redemption are at all times, and yet how unattainable.

Like Burt, Grossman also observes the spiritual focus of the book. Revell discusses this in an interview by Poets & Writers: "I am concerned with the governance of heaven, which is mostly silence. Living in Utah and Nevada, I take my current instruction from snow and sand. They are heavenly forms-substantial and effortless. May poems be so."
