= Alfred Corn =

American writer

- Born: Alfred DeWitt Corn III; August 14, 1943 (age 83); Bainbridge, Georgia
- Occupations: Poet, writer, critic
- Spouse: Ann Jones (divorced)
- Partner(s): Walter Brown, J.D. McClatchy
- Writing career
- Genres: Poetry, essays
- Notable awards: Guggenheim Fellowship; Fellowship of the Academy of American Poets

Alfred Corn (born August 14, 1943) is an American poet and essayist.

== Early life ==
Alfred Corn was born in Bainbridge, Georgia in 1943 and raised in Valdosta, Georgia.

Corn graduated from Emory University in 1965 with a B.A. in French literature and then earned an M.A. in French literature at Columbia University in 1967.

During the years 1967-1968 he traveled to Paris on a Fulbright Scholarship with his wife Ann Jones, whom he met three years earlier in France during a summer study program.

After he and Jones divorced, he was partnered with the architect Walter Brown from 1971 to 1976, and then with J.D. McClatchy from 1977 until 1989.

== Career ==
Corn's first book of poems, All Roads at Once, appeared in 1976, followed by A Call in the Midst of the Crowd (1978), The Various Light (1980), Notes from a Child of Paradise (1984), The West Door (1988), and Autobiographies (1992). His seventh book of poems, titled Present, appeared in 1997, along with a novel titled Part of His Story, and a study of prosody, The Poem’s Heartbeat (Story Line Press, 1997; Copper Canyon Press, 2008). Stake: Selected Poems, 1972–1992 appeared in 1999, followed by Contradictions in 2002. He has also published a collection of critical essays titled The Metamorphoses of Metaphor (1988) and a work of art criticism, Aaron Rose Photographs (Abrams Books, 2001). In January 2013, Tables, a volume of poems, was published by Press53. In April 2014, Unions, a volume of poems, was published by Barrow Street Press. In December 2014, Miranda's Book, a novel, was published by Eyewear Publishing in London, United Kingdom. A second selected poems volume appeared in 2022, titled The Returns: Collected Poems.

Corn was awarded the 1982 Levinson Prize by Poetry Magazine.

He received an Award in Literature from the Academy of Arts and Letters in 1983 and a Guggenheim Fellowship in 1986. In 1987, he was awarded a Fellowship of the Academy of American Poets.

Additional fellowships and prizes awarded for his poetry include the National Endowment for the Arts and a residency at The Bellagio Center for the Rockefeller Foundation.

== Teaching ==
From 1983 to 2001, Corn taught in the Graduate Writing Program of the Columbia University School of the Arts. He has held visiting posts at UCLA, the City University of New York, the University of Cincinnati, Ohio State University, Oklahoma State University, Sarah Lawrence, Yale University, and the University of Tulsa.

As a critic, he has written for The New York Times Book Review, The Nation, The Washington Post Book World, and The New Republic. Beginning in 1989 and continuing through the 1990s, he published reviews and articles for Art in America and ARTnews magazines.

For 2004–2005, he held the Amy Clampitt residency in Lenox, Massachusetts. In 2005–2006, he lived in London, teaching a course for the Poetry School, and one for the Arvon Foundation at Totleigh Barton, Devon. In 2007 he directed a poetry-writing course at Wroxton College in Oxfordshire, and in 2008 he taught at the Almássera Vella Arts Center in Spain.

His first play, Lowell's Bedlam, opened at Pentameters Theatre in London in 2011.

He was a visiting fellow at Clare Hall, Cambridge in 2012, and after his residency was made a Life Fellow.

In the same year, he published an e-book, Transatlantic Bridge: A Concise Guide to American and British English, detailing differences in vocabulary, pronunciation, grammar and punctuation.

== Critical reception ==
The critic Harold Bloom singled out Corn's All Roads at Once as the best first book of that year (The New Republic, 1976) and said in a jacket comment for A Call in the Midst of the Crowd that “Corn achieves an authority and resonance wholly worthy of his precursors. I know of nothing else of such ambition and realized power in Corn's own generation of American poets.", adding that "his aesthetic prospects are remarkable, even in this crowded time.”

Bloom would later include A Call in the Midst of the Crowd in his list of works constituting the Western Canon. Bloom’s characterization of these two books as belonging to the tradition of American Romanticism was a stimulus for much of the critical attention, positive or negative, focused on Corn during the following decades. Critics and poet-critics as diverse as Richard Howard, Charles Molesworth, Robert B. Shaw, Joel Conarroe, Jay Parini, John Hollander, Wayne Koestenbaum, Henry Louis Gates, Jr., Amy Clampitt, and Carolyn Forché, have made penetrating observations about his work.

== Corn's work relative to other literary "schools" ==
The New Princeton Encyclopedia of Poetry and Poetics (Princeton University Press, 1993) grouped Corn with poets who came to be known as the "New Formalists", but Corn has never appeared in the anthologies associated with this group. A noticeable percentage of his poetry uses meter, rhyme, and verse form, and he wrote a widely circulated introduction to English-language prosody, The Poem's Heartbeat. The critic Robert K. Martin, in his The Homosexual Tradition in American Poetry (1979, revised 1998), placed Corn's poetry in a line that begins with Whitman and continues through Crane, Merrill, and Thom Gunn to the present. Corn has appeared in several anthologies of gay poetry such as The World In Us (2000). He has also appeared in more general anthologies such as The Norton Anthology of Poetry (Fourth and Fifth Edition, 1996 and 2005) and The Making of a Poem (Mark Strand and Eavan Boland, 2000).

He has published two novels, the first, Part of His Story (favorably reviewed by critic A.O. Scott in The Nation) in 1997. His second, Miranda's Book, was published in the U.K. by Eyewear in 2014, and several short stories have appeared in magazines and anthologies, and these were collected in the volume Hosts, published in 2026.

== Works ==
- All Roads at Once (1976) Viking Press ISBN 0-670-11410-3
- A Call in the Midst of the Crowd: Poems (1978) Viking Press ISBN 0-670-19979-6
- The Various Light (1980) Viking Press ISBN 0-670-74322-4
- Notes from a Child of Paradise (1984) ISBN 0-670-51707-0
- The West Door: Poems (1988) Viking Press ISBN 0-670-81956-5
- The Metamorphoses of Metaphor: Essays in Poetry and Fiction (1987) Viking Press ISBN 0-670-81471-7
- Incarnation: Contemporary Writers on the New Testament, editor and contributor (1990) Viking Press ISBN 0-670-82504-2
- Autobiographies: Poems (1992) Viking Press ISBN 0-670-84602-3
- Part of His Story: A Novel (1997) Mid-List Press ISBN 0-922811-29-6
- Present (1997) Counterpoint ISBN 1-887178-31-7
- The Poem's Heartbeat: A Manual of Prosody (1997) Story Line Press ISBN 1-885266-40-5, (2008) Copper Canyon Press ISBN 978-1-55659-281-2
- Stake: Selected Poems, 1972–1992 (1999) Counterpoint ISBN 1-58243-024-1
- Contradictions: Poems (2002) Copper Canyon Press ISBN 1-55659-185-3
- Transatlantic Bridge: A Concise Guide to American and British English (2012) thEbooks
- Tables (2013) Press 53 ISBN 1-935708-74-0
- Unions (2014) Barrow Street Press ISBN 978-0-9893296-1-3
- Miranda's Book (2014) Eyewear Publishing Ltd.
- Rocinante (selected poems translated in Spanish) (2016) Chamán Ediciones, Spain ISBN 978-8494523311
- Antonio en el desierto (selected poems translated into Spanish) (2017) El Tucán de Virginia, Mexico.
- Arks & Covenants: Essays and Aphorisms (2017) Cat in the Sun Press ISBN 978-1946606006
- The Bamboo Pavilion (2019) in collaboration with Joanne Wang, translations of classic Chinese poems, Four Seasons Press (ISBN 978-1-7325892-4-7)
- The Duino Elegies, Rainer Maria Rilke, translated by Alfred Corn (2021). W.W. Norton. ISBN 978-1-324-00540-7
- The Returns: Collected Poems. 2022 Press 54. ISBN 978-1-950413-41-6-41-6
- All It Is/Tutto ciò che è (selected poems translated into Italian), I Quadri del Bardo, Italy (2024)
- Hosts: Stories, MadHat Press, 2026. ISBN 978-1-968422-04-2-04-2
