= Douglas Crase =

American poet, essayist and critic

Douglas Crase (born 1944) is an American poet, essayist and critic. He was born in 1944 in Battle Creek, Michigan. His poetry collection, The Revisionist, was nominated for a National Book Critics Circle Award and an American Book Award and was included by critic Harold Bloom in his list of works constituting the Western Canon of literature. He is a former MacArthur Fellow and the recipient of a Whiting Award. Crase lives in New York City and Honesdale, Pennsylvania. His work has been published in many collections, including his poem "Astropastoral", found in The KGB Bar Book Of Poems edited by David Lehman and Star Black.

== Selected works ==
The Revisionist, The Astropastorals published by Pressed Wafer, Lines from London Terrace, Essays and Addresses, The Revisionist and the Astropastorals published by Nightboat Books, AMERIFIL.TXT: A Commonplace Book (Poets On Poetry) and Ralph Waldo Emerson: Essays: The First and Second Series Format

His 2004 book Both: A Portrait in Two Parts was a 2005 Stonewall Honor Book in Non-Fiction.
