= May Swenson =

American poet

- Born: May 28, 1913; Logan, Utah, U.S.
- Died: December 4, 1989 (aged 76); Salisbury, Maryland, U.S.
- Education: Utah State University
- Occupations: Poet and Playwright, Chancellor of Academy of American Poets

Anna Thilda May Swenson (May 28, 1913 – December 4, 1989) was an American poet and playwright. Harold Bloom considered her one of the most important and original poets of the 20th century.

Born to Margaret and Dan Arthur Swenson, she was the eldest of 10 children in a Mormon household where Swedish was spoken regularly and English was a second language. Much of her later poetry was devoted to children (e.g. the 1970 collection Iconographs). She also translated the work of contemporary Swedish poets, including the selected poems of Nobel laureate Tomas Tranströmer.

== Personal life ==
Swenson attended Utah State University in Logan, Utah, graduating in 1934 with a bachelor's degree. She taught poetry as poet-in-residence at Bryn Mawr College, the University of North Carolina at Greensboro, the University of California, Riverside, Purdue University, and Utah State University. From 1959 to 1966 she worked as a manuscript reviewer at New Directions Publishing. Swenson left New Directions Press in 1966 in an effort to focus on her writing. She served as a chancellor of the Academy of American Poets from 1980 until her death in 1989. She is buried in the Logan City Cemetery, and her grave is marked by a granite bench on which is etched some of her poetry. For the last 20 years of her life, she lived in Sea Cliff, New York.

In 1936, Swenson worked as an editor and ghostwriter for a man called "Plat", who became her "boyfriend". "I think I should like to have a son by Plat", she wrote in her diary, "but I would not like to be married to any man, but only be myself." After some relationships with men, Swenson primarily partnered with women after 1938. Historians suspect she was a Lesbian or Bisexual, and her Latter-day Saint parents regularly corresponded with her female life partners in a manner that suggests a general acceptance of her sexuality.

Her poems were published in Antaeus, The Atlantic Monthly, Carleton Miscellany, The Nation, The New Yorker, The Paris Review, Saturday Review, Parnassus, and Poetry. Her poem Question was also published in Stephenie Meyer's book The Host.

== Awards and recognition ==
Swenson received much recognition for her work, including:

- American Introductions Prize in 1955
- William Rose Benet Prize of the Poetry Society of America in 1959
- Longview Foundation Award in 1959
- National Institute of Arts and Letters Award in 1960
- Brandeis University Creative Arts Award in 1967
- Lucy Martin Donnelly Award of Bryn Mawr College in 1968
- Shelley Poetry Award in 1968
- Guggenheim fellowship in 1959
- Amy Lowell Traveling Scholarship in 1960
- Ford Foundation grant in 1964
- Bollingen Prize for poetry in 1981
- MacArthur Fellowship in 1987

== Style, imagery, and eroticism ==
Swenson created poems in "iconograph" style, first published in her 1970 book Iconographs, in which she shaped lines of her poetry to create images relating to the poem's content. Her work "The Lowering", for instance, a memorial poem for Robert F. Kennedy, explored Kennedy's military funeral, with lines arranged in the shape of a folded flag. Swenson is known for her heavy use of natural imagery, mixed with religious and philosophical themes. Her poem "Snow By Morning", which was published in The New Yorker, compares a snowfall to the biblical fall of manna. Swenson's sense of imagery also lends itself to erotic poems, as she describes human bodies, breasts, limbs, and the "pelvic heave of mountains". Author Jean Gould called Swenson's work "sensual as well as sexual."

== Legacy ==
Washington University in St. Louis houses most of Swenson's documents and original manuscripts. This is the primary location for all scholarly materials on Swenson. They were featured as "Celebrating Pride Month: the May Swenson Papers" in a digital exhibit in 2018 by Rose Miyatsu at WUSTL.

Utah State University also has two collections of her work, and an addendum in their Special Collections and Archives. The University has created the "May Swenson Project." Supported by students and teachers, it has publicized Swenson's work at USU, as well as her influence across the nation. In her name, USU has dedicated a May Swenson room in the English Department and another in the USU Merrill-Cazier Library. Funds are being sought to establish an endowed chair in Swenson's name.

The May Swenson Poetry Award, sponsored by Utah State University Press, was a competitive prize granted annually to an outstanding collection of poetry in English from 1996 to 2016. Open to published and unpublished writers, with no limitation on subject, the competition honors May Swenson as one of America's most vital and provocative poets of the twentieth century. Judges for the competition have included Mary Oliver, Maxine Kumin, John Hollander, Mark Doty, Alice Quinn, Harold Bloom, Garrison Keillor, Edward Field and others from the first tier of American letters.

Digitized selected works by and about Swenson: May Swenson Addendum (Selected items)

== Bibliography ==
=== Poetry ===
- Another Animal (Scribner, 1954);
- A Cage of Spines (Rinehart, 1958);
- To Mix with Time: New and Selected Poems (Scribner, 1963);
- Poems to Solve (for children "14-up") (Scribner, 1966);
- Half Sun Half Sleep (Scribner, 1967);
- Iconographs (Scribner, 1970);
- More Poems to Solve (Scribner, 1971);
- New & Selected Things Taking Place (Little, Brown, 1978);
- In Other Words (Knopf, 1987);
- Collected Poems (Library of America, 2013).

=== Prose ===
- Made With Words, ed. Gardner McFall (U of Mich Press, 1998).

=== Translations ===
- Windows and Stones: Selected Poems of Tomas Tranströmer (1972)

== See also ==
- Lesbian Poetry
