= Michael Palmer (poet) =

American poet and translator (born 1943)

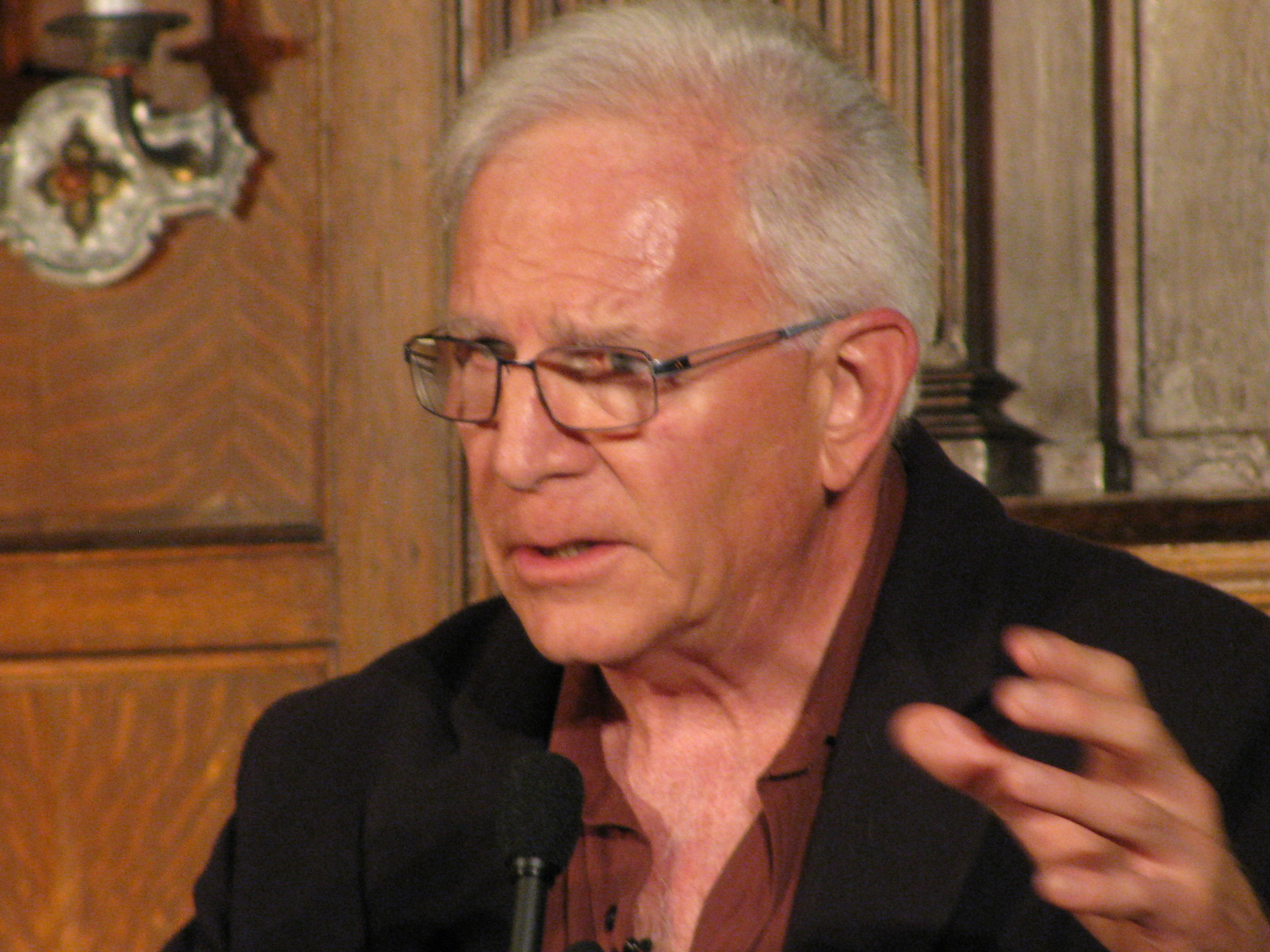
- Reading at Lannan Poetry Series (March 2015)
- Born: May 11, 1943 (age 83); Manhattan, New York, U.S.
- Occupations: Poet, translator
- Writing career
- Genres: poetry, prose, "analytic lyric"
- Movements: postmodern, Language poetry

Michael Palmer (born May 11, 1943) is an American poet and translator. He attended Harvard University, where he earned a BA in French and an MA in Comparative Literature. He has worked extensively with Contemporary dance since the 1970s and has collaborated with many composers and visual artists. Palmer has lived in San Francisco since 1969.

Palmer is the 2006 recipient of the Wallace Stevens Award from the Academy of American Poets. (Note: Robert Hass, among those selecting Palmer to receive the award, wrote: "Michael Palmer is the foremost experimental poet of his generation and perhaps of the last several generations. A gorgeous writer who has taken cues from Wallace Stevens, the Black Mountain poets, John Ashbery, contemporary French poets, the poetics of Octavio Paz, and from language poetries. He is one of the most original craftsmen at work in English at the present time. His poetry is at once a dark and comic interrogation of the possibilities of representation in language, but its continuing surprise is its resourcefulness and its sheer beauty." - Press release from poets.org)

== Beginnings ==
Michael Palmer began actively pursuing a career in poetry during the 1960s. Two events in the early sixties seem decisive to his development as a poet.

First, Palmer attended the Vancouver Poetry Conference in 1963. This July–August 1963 Poetry Conference in Vancouver, British Columbia spanned three weeks and involved about sixty people who had registered for a program of discussions, workshops, lectures, and readings designed by Warren Tallman and Robert Creeley as a summer course at the University of B.C. There Palmer met writers and artists who would leave a mark on his own developing sense of a poetics, especially Robert Duncan, Robert Creeley, and Clark Coolidge, with whom he formed lifelong friendships. It was a landmark moment as Robert Creeley observed:

“The Vancouver Poetry Conference brought together for the first time, a decisive company of then disregarded poets such as Denise Levertov, Charles Olson, Allen Ginsberg, Robert Duncan, Margaret Avison, Philip Whalen... together with as yet unrecognised younger poets of that time, Michael Palmer, Clark Coolidge and many more.”

The second decisive event in Palmer’s early career as a poet began with the editing of the journal Joglars alongside fellow poet Clark Coolidge. Joglars (Providence, Rhode Island) numbered just three issues in all, published between 1964 and 1966, but it extended Palmer’s correspondence with fellow poets begun in Vancouver. The first issue appeared in Spring 1964 and included poems by Gary Snyder, Michael McClure, Fielding Dawson, Jonathan Williams, Lorine Niedecker, Robert Kelly, and Louis Zukofsky. Palmer published five of his own poems in the second number of Joglars, an issue that included work by Larry Eigner, Stan Brakhage, Russell Edson, and Jackson Mac Low.

For those who attended the Vancouver Conference or learned about it later on, it was apparent that second-generation modernist poet Charles Olson was exerting a significant influence on the emerging generation of artists and poets (the so-called third-generation modernists) who came to prominence in the 1950s and 1960s, and included the New American poets. The latter poets, such as Robert Creeley, Robert Duncan, and Denise Levertov would have an impact on the new generation of artists emerging in the 1970s, which included Palmer. Says Palmer:

“...before meeting that group of poets in 1963 at the Vancouver Poetry Conference, I had begun to read them intensely, and they proposed alternatives to the poets I was encountering at that time at Harvard, the confessional poets, whose work was grounded to a greater or lesser degree in New Criticism, at least those were their mentors. The confessional poets struck me as people absolutely lusting for fame, all of them, and they were all trying to write great lines.”

== Work and recognition ==
Palmer is the author of fourteen full-length books of poetry, beginning in 1972 with Blake's Newton and most recently in 2021 with Little Elegies for Sister Satan. Other notable collections include Company of Moths (2005) (shortlisted for the 2006 Canadian Griffin Poetry Prize), The Promises of Glass (2000), At Passages (1996), Sun (1988), and Notes for Echo Lake (1981).

A prose work, The Danish Notebook, was published in 1999. In the spring of 2007, a chapbook, The Counter-Sky (with translations by Koichiro Yamauchi), was published by Meltemia Press of Japan, to coincide with the Tokyo Poetry and Dance Festival. Palmer’s work has appeared in literary magazines such as Boundary 2, Berkeley Poetry Review, Sulfur, Conjunctions, Grand Street and O-blek.

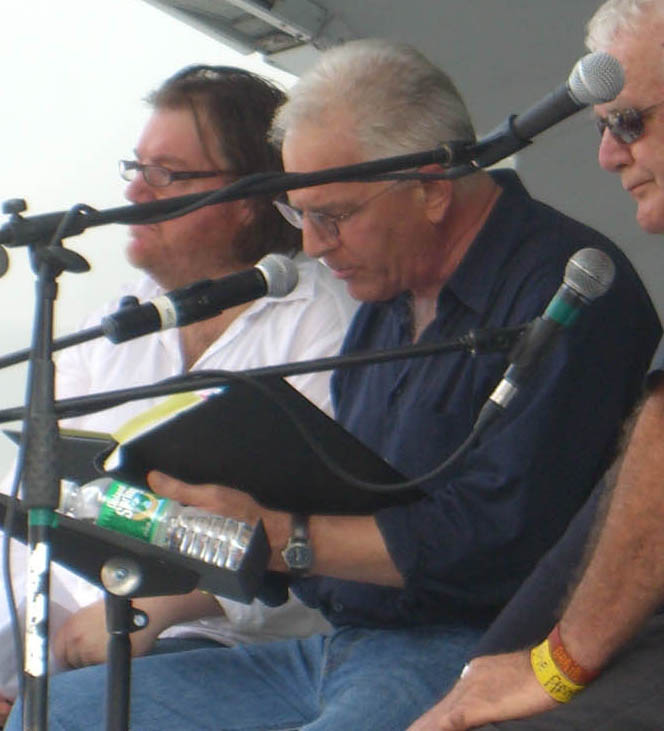
Palmer (center) at the 2009 Brooklyn Book Festival

Besides the 2006 Wallace Stevens Award, Michael Palmer's honors include two grants from the Literature Program of the National Endowment for the Arts. In 1989-90 he was a Guggenheim Fellow. During the years 1992–1994 he held a Lila Wallace-Reader's Digest Fund Writer's Award. From 1999 to 2004, he served as a Chancellor of the Academy of American Poets. In the spring of 2001 he received the Shelley Memorial Award from the Poetry Society of America.

Since he seems to explore the nature of language and its relation to human consciousness and perception, Palmer is often associated with the Language poets. Of this particular association, Palmer comments in an interview:

”It goes back to an organic period when I had a closer association with some of those writers than I do now, when we were a generation in San Francisco with lots of poetic and theoretical energy and desperately trying to escape from the assumptions of poetic production that were largely dominant in our culture. My own hesitancy comes when you try to create, let's say, a fixed theoretical matrix and begin to work from an ideology of prohibitions about expressivity and the self — there I depart quite dramatically from a few of the Language Poets.”

== Themes and writing style ==
Introducing Palmer for a reading in 1996, Brighde Mullins noted that his poetics is both “situated yet active.” Likewise, Palmer himself speaks of the poem on the page as signaling a "site of passages":

"The space of the page is taken as a site in itself, a syntactical and visual space to be expressively exploited, as was the case with the Black Mountain poets, as well as writers such as Frank O'Hara, perhaps partly in response to gestural abstract painting."

Elsewhere, Palmer observes that "in our reading we have to rediscover the radical nature of the poem" and search for "the essential place of lyric poetry" as we delve "beneath it to its relationship with language". Here Palmer confronts not only the problem of subjectivity and public address, but the specific agency of poetry and its relationship with the political:

"The implicit...question has always concerned the human and social justification for this strange thing, poetry, when it is not directly driven by the political or by some other, equally other evident purpose [...] Whereas the significant artistic thrust has always been toward artistic independence within the world, not from it."

If poetry and literature is, as Ezra Pound observed, "news that stays news," in his own work Palmer also wants to account for a subterranean or “counter-tradition”. He invokes the latter as a way to “think against” the prevailing doxa, and to have access to an 'alternative tradition' that slips under the radar of the Academy but exerts an underground influence.

And the poem, from its homeless home,
writes of blindsight and silence

from the poem "Night Gardening", Company of Moths (2005)

Palmer has repeatedly stated, in interviews and talks over the years, that the situation for the poet and/or the poem is parodoxical: a seeing which is blind, a "nothing you can see", an "active waiting", "purposive, sometimes a music", or a "nowhere" that is "now / here". For Palmer, poetry can "interrogate the radical and violent instability of our moment, asking where is the location of culture, where the site of self, selves, among others" (as Palmer has characterized the poetry of Myung Mi Kim).

== Critical reception ==
Michael Palmer's poetry has been described variously as abstract, intimate, elegant, hermetic, allusive, personal, political, speculative, and inaccessible. (Note: "Choose your euphemism for the work of Michael Palmer", writes columnist Anneli Rufus, "who has been busy in the Bay Area these past thirty years, writing and translating poetry and collaborating with painters and choreographers".)

"How does the human break down so completely that the only alternative we have is to impose massive destruction and then...massive suffering among civilian populations?"

Michael Palmer

While some reviewers or readers may value Palmer's work as an "extension of modernism", some criticize Palmer's work as discordant: an interruption of our composure (to invoke Robert Duncan's phrase).

As for the modernist project, its legacy is something Palmer both resists and embraces. Palmer is candid about the towering figures of early modernism, the great inventors of the period, with opinions similar to Yeats, Eliot and Pound. Contrarily, Palmer clearly states that there remains “something quite harrowing inscribed at the heart of modernism.” (Note: Palmer has been quoted as saying that Pound's fascism, Eliot's anti-semitism, and even Yeats' nostalgia lead one to suspect there is something harrowing "inscribed in the heart of modernism")

Palmer’s concern is “to maintain or at least continue the search for an ethics of the I/Thou." The poet must suffer 'loss', embrace disturbance and paradox, agonizing over what cannot be accounted for. Palmer will admit into his work that "essential errancy of discovery in the poem" that would not be a “unified narrative explanation of the self,” but would allow for “cloaked meaning and necessary semantic indirection.”

== Collaborations ==
Perhaps similar to Olson's and Duncan’s impact on their generation, Palmer's influence remains singular and palpable, if difficult to measure. For many decades now, Palmer has worked collaboratively in the fields of dance, translation, teaching, and the visual arts.

Palmer has published translations from French, Russian, and Brazilian Portuguese. He edited and helped translate Nothing The Sun Could Not Explain: Twenty Contemporary Brazilian Poets. With Michael Molnar and John High, Palmer helped edit and translate a volume of poetry by the Russian poet Alexei Parshchikov, Blue Vitriol (Avec Books, 1994). And he translated "Theory of Tables" (1994), a book written by Emmanuel Hocquard, a project that grew out of Hocquard's translations of Palmer's "Baudelaire Series" into French. Palmer has written many radio plays and works of criticism.

He has participated in multiple collaborations with a wide range of painters. These include the German painter Gerhard Richter, Italian painter Sandro Chia and French painter Micaëla Henich. (Note: "Micaëla Henich's collection of 1003 india ink drawings, published under the title "Mille e tre", is accompanied by 5 writer-poet-thinkers who were asked each to write on 200 of the drawings in the series (the last three have no text). They are: Jacques Derrida, Dominique Fourcade, Michael Palmer, Tom Raworth, Jacques Roubaud. Derrida's appeared in "Mille e tre, cinq: Lignées" (published by William Blake & Co.))

=== Dance ===
Since the 1970s, Palmer has collaborated on over a dozen dance works with Margaret Jenkins and her Dance Company. Early dance scenarios in which Palmer participated include Interferences, 1975; Equal Time, 1976; No One but Whitington, 1978; Red, Yellow, Blue, 1980, Straight Words, 1980; Versions by Turns, 1980; Cortland Set, 1982; and First Figure, 1984.

=== Painters and visual artists ===
Similar to his friendship with Robert Duncan and the painter Jess Collins, Palmer's work with painter Irving Petlin is important.

Palmer has also worked with painter and visual artist Augusta Talbot, and curated her exhibition at the CUE Art Foundation (March 17 -April 23, 2005) Talbot, in turn, provided the cover art for Palmer’s collection The Company of Moths (2005) and for Thread (2006). When asked how collaboration has pushed or shaped the boundaries of his work, Palmer responded:

“One was that, when I was using language — but even when I wasn't, when I was simply envisioning a structure, for example — I was working with the idea of actual space. Over time, my own language took on a certain physicality or gestural character that it hadn't had as strongly in the earliest work. Margy (Margaret Jenkins) and I would often work with language as gesture and gesture as language---we would cross these two media, have them join at some nexus. And inevitably then, as I brought certain characteristics of my work to dance, and to dance structure and gesture, it started crossing over into my work. It added space to the poems.

These are not one-off collaborations for Palmer: they are on-going. It may be that friendship via collaboration becomes part of what Jack Spicer terms a "composition of the real.” And that might articulate a place for, and even spaces where, both the "poetic imaginary" is constituted and a possible social space is envisioned.

== Bibliography ==
=== Poetry ===
- Plan of the City of O, Barn Dreams Press (Boston, Massachusetts), 1971.
- Blake's Newton, Black Sparrow Press (Santa Barbara, California), 1972.
- C's Songs, Sand Dollar Books (Berkeley, California), 1973.
- Six Poems, Black Sparrow Press (Santa Barbara, California), 1973.
- The Circular Gates, Black Sparrow Press (Santa Barbara, California), 1974.
- (Translator, with Geoffrey Young) Vicente Huidobro, Relativity of Spring: 13 Poems, Sand Dollar Books (Berkeley, California), 1976.
- Without Music, Black Sparrow Press (Santa Barbara, California), 1977.
- Alogon, Tuumba Press (Berkeley, California), 1980.
- Notes for Echo Lake, North Point Press (Berkeley, California), 1981.
- (Translator) Alain Tanner and John Berger, Jonah Who Will Be 25 in the Year 2000, North Atlantic Books (Berkeley, California), 1983.
- First Figure, North Point Press (Berkeley, California), 1984.
- Sun, North Point Press (Berkeley, California), 1988.
- At Passages, New Directions (New York, New York), 1995.
- The Lion Bridge: Selected Poems, 1972-1995, New Directions (New York, New York), 1998.
- The Promises of Glass, New Directions (New York, New York), 2000.
- Codes Appearing: Poems, 1979-1988, New Directions (New York, New York), 2001. Notes for Echo Lake, First Figure, and Sun together in one volume. ISBN 978-0-8112-1470-4
- (With Régis Bonvicino) Cadenciando-um-ning, um samba, para o outro: poemas, traduções, diálogos, Atelieì Editorial (Cotia, Brazil), 2001.
- Company of Moths, New Directions (New York, New York), 2005. ISBN 978-0-8112-1623-4
- Aygi Cycle , Druksel (Ghent, Belgium), 2009 (chapbook with 10 new poems, inspired by the Russian poet Gennadiy Aygi.
- (With Jan Lauwereyns) Truths of Stone, Druksel (Ghent, Belgium), 2010.
- Thread, New Directions (New York, New York), 2011. ISBN 978-0-8112-1921-1
- The Laughter of the Sphinx, New Directions (New York, New York), 2016. ISBN 978-0-8112-2554-0 (Note: Although it was published in June 2016, various sources had originally reported a release date of 2015. Jerome Rothenberg noted a 2015 publication by New Directions here: Michael Palmer: New poems from 'The Laughter of the Sphinx,' for Mac Low, Tcherepnin, & Artaud)
- Little Elegies for Sister Satan. New Directions (New York, New York), 2021. ISBN 9780811230896

=== Other ===
- Idem 1-4 (radio plays), 1979.
- (Editor) Code of Signals: Recent Writings in Poetics, North Atlantic Books (Berkeley, California), 1983.
- The Danish Notebook, Avec Books (Penngrove, California), 1999 — prose/memoir
- Active Boundaries: Selected Essays and Talks, New Directions (New York, New York), 2008. ISBN 0-8112-1754-X

=== Palmer sites and exhibits ===
- Exhibit at The Academy of American Poets includes links to on-line poems by Palmer not listed below
- Modern American Poetry site
- Author Page at Internationales Literatufestival Berlin site (in English) Palmer was a guest of the ILB (Internationales Literatufestival Berlin/ Germany) in 2001 and 2005.
- An internet bibliography for Michael Palmer from LiteraryHistory.com

=== Poems ===
- "Dream of a Language That Speaks" a poem from Company of Moths (2005) @ Jacket Magazine site
- "Scale" first published in Richter 858 (ed. David Breskin, The Shifting Foundation, SF MOMA: San Francisco Museum of Modern Art); included in Company of Moths
- "Autobiography 3" & Autobiography 5" two poems from Conjunctions magazine's on-line archive; included in The Promises of Glass (2000)
- To the Title (Are there titles?) included in Jacket Magazine 33
- four poems from Thread from Boston Review's March/April 2010 issue
- Late Night Poetry @ Tony Bilson's Number One: Palmer reads "The Dream of Narcissus" on YouTube Video of Palmer at the 2010 Sydney (Australia) Writers Festival.
- Michael Palmer reads Mahmoud Darwish's "The Strangers' Picnic" on YouTube Video of Palmer reading a poem from Mahmoud Darwish's collection Unfortunately, It Was Paradise: Selected Poems
- Michael Palmer, Paul Hoover with the poetry of Maria Baranda - September 27, 2015 – Palmer reads from his book Thread and from his forthcoming collection The Laughter of the Sphinx. He also reads a single poem from his collection The Company of Moths.

=== Selected essays and talks ===
- Period (senses of duration) this is a version of a talk Palmer gave in San Francisco in February 1982. Scroll down to "Table of Contents" to find the Palmer selection. Here it appears in an e-book representation of Code of Signals (which Palmer edited in 1983, with the subtitle "Recent Writings in Poetics").
- On Robert Duncan reprint of Palmer's essay "Robert Duncan and Romantic Synthesis"
- Michael Palmer audio-files at PENNsound
- "On the Sustaining of Culture in Dark Times" text of Palmer's keynote address given at the 3rd Annual Sustainable Living Conference at Evergreen State College in February 2004
- "Ground Work: On Robert Duncan" Michael Palmer's "Introduction" to a combined edition of Ground Work: Before the War, and Ground Work II: In the Dark, published by New Directions in April 2006.
- Lunch Poems reading by Michael Palmer: Webcast Held on October 5, 2006, in the Morrison Library, University of California at Berkeley: webcast online
- "In Company: On Artistic Collaboration and Solitude" This is the title of the lecture/talk that Palmer gave, along with a poetry reading, at the University of Chicago in October 2006. (In audio & video format)
- Bad to the bone: What I learned outside Lecture & Talk given in June 2002, when Palmer taught for a brief stint at the Jack Kerouac School of Disembodied Poetics at Naropa in Boulder, Colorado (Note: The note on the website indicates that in this lecture, Michael Palmer is exploring translation and its aesthetic implications. The title refers to writers who refuse to submit to an authoritarian poetic or political reality. Palmer discusses Arthur Rimbaud, Herman Melville, Stéphane Mallarmé, Friedrich Hölderlin, Octavio Paz and Paul Celan. The lecture concludes with a brief question and answer session.)
- Poetic Obligations (Talking about Nothing at Temple) This is a talk Palmer gave at Temple University in February 1999, and was originally published in Fulcrum: An annual of poetry and aesthetics (Issue 2, 2003).
- Poetry and Contingency: Within a Timeless Moment of Barbaric Thought essay/talk originally published in the Chicago Review (June, 2003)

=== Interviews with Palmer ===
- The River City Interview conducted by Paul Naylor, Lindsay Hill, and J. P. Craig; appeared in 1994.
- An Interview with Michael Palmer by Robert Hicks in 2006
- Interview at Berkeley Daily Planet: April 7, 2006 discusses a reading Palmer & Douglas Blazek gave together at Moe's, a bookstore in Berkeley, California; includes interviews
- Interview with Michael Palmer an interview conducted at Washington University in St. Louis in 2008 by the student editors of "Arch Literary Journal" in conjunction with a talk and reading Palmer gave at the school. Includes an introductory essay by one of the editors, Lawrence Revard, "'What Reading?': Play in Michael Palmer's Poetics"
- "An interview with Michael Palmer". The Lit Show. Litshow.com. 2013-02-13.

=== Others on Palmer ===
- Margaret Jenkins Dance Company info on both Palmer & his collaborators in their on-going work with Dance
- Lauri Ramey:"Michael Palmer: The Lion Bridge" Ramey wrote a doctoral dissertation on Palmer, and here reviews his "Selected Poems"
- A Collision of "Possible Worlds" A 2002 review of The Promises of Glass by Michael Dowdy @Free Verse website
- A review of Company of Moths a book review of Palmer's 2005 collection
- Griffin Poetry Prize biography, including audio and video clips Palmer was shortlisted for this prize in 2006
- Margaret Jenkins Dance Company's "A Slipping Glimpse" 2006 dance piece in collaboration with Tanushree Shankar Dance School & the text by Palmer
- Cultural camaraderie article from Hindustantimes.com on the dance performance A Slipping Glimpse. Article discusses Palmer's collaboration (includes quotes)
- Palmer is Spring 2007 Writer in Residence press release from California College of the Arts
- Michael Palmer (Six Introductions) a brief essay by Clayton Eshleman who edited Sulfur magazine, for which Palmer served as a contributing editor.
- Hands Across Many Seas: From San Francisco and India, a dance collaboration article by Deborah Jowitt on "A Slipping Glimpse", performed by the Margaret Jenkins Dance Company at the "Danspace Project" at Saint Mark's Church, October 4 through 6, 2007
- Lyric Persuasions at Poets House Rae Armantrout and Zoketsu Norman Fischer discuss Michael Palmer's work as recorded by Vasiliki Katsarou at the Poet's House in the Spring of 2010
