= Ann Lauterbach =

American writer (born 1942)

- Born: 1942 (age 83–84)
- Occupations: Poet; essayist; art critic; professor

Ann Lauterbach (born 1942) is an American poet, essayist, art critic, and professor.

== Early life ==
Lauterbach was born and raised in New York City, and earned her B.A. from the University of Wisconsin. She lived in London for eight years, working in publishing and for art institutions, including London's Thames and Hudson art publishing house. On her return to the U.S., she worked in art galleries in New York before she began teaching.

== Poetry ==
Lauterbach’s most recent poetry collections are Door (2023) and Spell (2018), both published by Penguin Books. Lauterbach’s poems have been published in numerous literary journals and magazines including Conjunctions, and in anthologies including American Hybrid: A Norton Anthology of New Poetry (W.W. Norton, 2009) and American Women Poets in the 21st Century: Where Lyric Meets Language (Wesleyan University Press, 2002).

== Teaching ==
She has taught at Brooklyn College, Columbia University, the Iowa Writers Workshop, Princeton University, and at the City College of New York and Graduate Center of CUNY. Since 1991 she has taught at Bard College, and is currently David and Ruth Schwab Professor of Languages and Literature there, where she teaches and co-directs the Writing Division of the M.F.A. program, and lives in Germantown, New York. As an art critic, she has taught at the Yale School of Art, Yale University.

== Honors ==
Her honors include fellowships from the Guggenheim Foundation, the Ingram Merrill Foundation, the John D. and Catherine T. MacArthur Foundation, and the New York State Foundation for the Arts. Her 2023 book, Door, was a finalist for the Griffin Poetry Prize.

== Selected bibliography ==
Poetry

- Door (Penguin Books, 2023)
- Spell (Penguin Books, 2018)
- Under the Sign (Penguin Books, 2013)
- Or to Begin Again (Penguin Books, 2009)
- Hum (Penguin Books, 2005)
- If in Time: Selected Poems 1975-2000 (Penguin Books, 2001)
- On a Stair (Penguin Books, 1997)
- And for Example (Penguin Books, 1994)
- Clamor (Viking, 1991)
- Before Recollection (Princeton University Press, 1987)
- Many Times, but Then (University of Texas Press, 1979)

Prose

- Saint Petersburg Notebook
- The Given & The Chosen
- The Night Sky: Writings on the Poetics of Experience (Viking, 2005)

Books with artists

- Thripsis (with Joe Brainard)
- A Clown, Some Colors, A Doll, Her Stories, A Song, A Moonlit Cove (with Ellen Phelan)
- How Things Bear Their Telling (with Lucio Pozzi)
- Greeks (with Jan Groover and Bruce Boice)
- Sacred Weather (with Louisa Chase)
