= Grennan =

Grennan is an Irish surname. It may be of Norman origin, from the French name Grenan. Notable people with the surname include:

- Eamon Grennan (born 1941), Irish poet
- James Grennan, Irish Gaelic footballer who played for Offaly
- Justin Grennan (born 1978), American singer
- Keith Grennan (born 1984), American football player
- Mike Grennan (1950–2009), American curler
- Seán Grennan, Irish dual player of Gaelic football and hurling who played for Offaly
- Tom Grennan (born 1995), English singer and songwriter
- Winston Grennan (1944–2000), Jamaican drummer
- Jacqueline Grennan Wexler (1926–2012), American academic administrator

== See also ==
- Greenan (surname)
- Julia Grenan (1884–1972), Irish nationalist and socialist in the Easter Rising
- Grennan (disambiguation)
