= List of winners of the Harold Morton Landon Translation Award =

The Harold Morton Landon Translation Award is a $1,000 award by the Academy of American Poets, for a published translation of poetry from any language into English. A noted translator chooses the winning book.

It's an award mentioned by the National Endowment for the Humanities, when awarding the National Humanities Medal.

Year	Poet	Book	Judges
2026	Niloufar Talebi	Elegies of the Earth: Selected Poems by Ahmad Shamlou	Cynthia Hogue
2025	Gabriel Gudding	Friends with Everyone by Gunnar Wærness	Roger Sedarat
2024	Patrizio Ceccagnoli	Historiae by Antonella Anedda	Valzhyna Mort
2024	Susan Stewart	Historiae by Antonella Anedda	Valzhyna Mort
2023	Stephanie McCarter	Metamorphoses by Ovid	Anna Deeny Morales
2022	Adriana X. Jacobs	The Truffle Eye by Vaan Nguyen	David Shook
2021	Maria Dahvana Headley	Beowulf: A New Translation	Indran Amirthanayagam
2020	Rajiv Mohabir	I Even Regret Night: Holi Songs of Demerara by Lalbihari Sharma	Daniel Borzutzky
2019	Clare Cavanagh	Asymmetry by Adam Zagajewski	Dunya Mikhail
2018	David Larsen	Names of the Lion by Ibn Khalawayh	Ammiel Alcalay
2017	Piotr Florczyk	Building the Barricade by Anna Świrszczyńska	Marilyn Hacker
2016	Ron Padgett	Zone: Selected Poems by Guillaume Apollinaire	Peter Cole
2015	Roger Greenwald	Guarding the Air: Selected Poems of Gunnar Harding	Bill Johnston
2014	W. S. Merwin	Selected Translations	David Hinton
2013	Cynthia Hogue and Sylvain Gallais	Fortino Sámano (The Overflowing of the Poem) by Virginie Lalucq and Jean-Luc Nancy	Erín Moure
2012	Jen Hofer	Negro Marfil / Ivory Black by Myriam Moscona	Pierre Joris
2011	Jeffrey Angles	Forest of Eyes: Selected Poems of Tada Chimako	Charles Martin
2010	Stephen Kessler	Desolation of the Chimera by Luis Cernuda	Edith Grossman
2009	Avi Sharon	C. P. Cavafy: Selected Poems	John Balaban
2008	Clayton Eshleman	The Complete Poetry of Cesar Vallejo	Jerome Rothenberg
2007	Robert Fagles	The Aeneid by Virgil	Christopher Merrill
2007	Susanna Nied	it by Inger Christensen	Christopher Merrill
2006	Richard Zenith	Education by Stone: Selected Poems	Willis Barnstone
2005	Daryl Hine	Works of Hesiod and the Homeric Hymns	Mark Strand
2004	Charles Martin	Metamorphoses by Ovid	Rika Lesser
2004	Anselm Hollo	Pentii Saarikoski's Trilogy	Rika Lesser
2003	W. S. Merwin	Sir Gawain and the Green Knight (Anonymous)	Robert Bly
2002	David Ferry	The Epistles of Horace by Horace	Carolyn Forché
2001	Clayton Eshleman	Trilce by César Vallejo	Ron Padgett
2001	Edward Snow	Duino Elegies by Rainer Maria Rilke	Ron Padgett
2000	Cola Franzen	Horses in the Air by Jorge Guillén	Marie Ponsot
1999	W. D. Snodgrass	Selected Translations	William Jay Smith
1998	Louis Simpson	Modern Poets of France: A Bilingual Anthology	Rachel Hadas
1997	David Hinton	Landscape Over Zero by Bei Dao; The Late Poems of Meng Chiao; The Selected Poems of Lí Po	Rosmarie Waldrop
1996	Guy Davenport	7 Greeks	Eliot Weinberger
1995	Robert Pinsky	The Inferno of Dante: A New Verse Translation	David Ferry
1994	Rosmarie Waldrop	The Book of Margins by Edmond Jabès	Robert Hass
1993	Charles Simic	The Horse Has Six Legs: An Anthology of Serbian Poetry	Carolyn Kizer
1992	John DuVal	The Discovery of America by Cesare Pascarella	Edmund Keeley
1992	Andrew Schelling	Dropping the Bow: Poems of Ancient India	Edmund Keeley
1991	Robert Fagles	The Iliad by Homer	Gregory Rabassa
1990	Stephen Mitchell	Variable Directions by Dan Pagis	Serge Gavronsky
1989	Martin Greenberg (poet)	Heinrich von Kleist: Five Plays	John Hollander
1988	Peter Hargitai	Perched on Nothing's Branch by Attila József	May Swenson
1987	Mark Anderson	In the Storm of Roses by Ingeborg Bachmann	Charles Wright
1986	William Arrowsmith	The Storm and Other Things by Eugenio Montale	W. S. Merwin
1985	Edward Snow	New Poems [1907] by Rainer Maria Rilke	Allen Mandelbaum
1984	Robert Fitzgerald	The Odyssey by Homer	William Arrowsmith
1984	Stephen Mitchell	The Selected Poetry of Rainer Maria Rilke	William Arrowsmith
1982	Rika Lesser	Guide to the Underworld by Gunnar Ekelöf	Richard Howard
1980	Saralyn R. Daly	The Book of True Love by Juan Ruis	Charles Simic
1980	Edmund Keeley	Ritsos in Parentheses	Charles Simic
1978	Galway Kinnell	The Poems of François Villon	Mark Strand
1978	Howard Norman	The Wishing Bone Cycle: Narrative Poems of the Swampy Cree Indians	Mark Strand
1976	Robert Fitzgerald	The Iliad by Homer	Richard Wilbur
