= Greenan =

Greenan may refer to:

- Greenan (surname)

== Places ==
Northern Ireland

- Greenan, Aghaderg, a townland in the civil parish of Aghaderg in County Down
- Greenan, Bodoney Lower, a townland in the civil parish of Bodoney Lower in County Tyrone
- Greenan, County Armagh, a townland in the civil parish of Grange in County Armagh
- Greenan, County Fermanagh, a townland in the civil parish of Kinawley in County Fermanagh
- Greenan, County Londonderry, a townland in the civil parish of Faughanvale in County Londonderry
- Greenan, Culfeightrin, a townland in the civil parish of Culfeightrin in County Antrim
- Greenan, Dromore, County Down, a townland in civil parish of Dromore in County Down
- Greenan, Dromore, County Tyrone, a townland in the civil parish of Dromore in County Tyrone
- Greenan, Duneane, a townland in the civil parish of Duneane in County Antrim
- Greenan, Kilskeery, a townland in the civil parish of Kilskeery in County Tyrone
- Greenan, Newry, a townland in the civil parish of Newry in County Down

Republic of Ireland

- Greenan Mountain, County Donegal
- Greenan, County Donegal, a townland in the civil parish of Killymard, County Donegal
- Greenan, County Wicklow, a village
- Greenan, Kilbeggan, a townland in the civil parish of Kilbeggan, County Westmeath
- Greenan, Killucan, a townland in the civil parish of Killucan, County Westmeath
- The Greenan, an alternative name for the Grianan of Aileach, an ancient stone-fort atop Greenan Mountain, County Donegal

Scotland

- Greenan, South Ayrshire, a settlement in Scotland
- Greenan Castle, a castle in Scotland
