= Brasfield =

Brasfield (or Brassfield) is an English-language surname. People with this surname include:

== Brasfield ==
- Furonda Brasfield, America's Next Top Model contestant
- Guy Brasfield Park (1872–1946), Missouri politician
- James Brasfield, translator of Oleh Lysheha's work
- Rod Brasfield (1910–1958), American comedian
- Brasfield & Gorrie, a large U.S. construction company

== Brassfield ==
- Darin Brassfield (born 1960), American racing driver

== Other uses ==
- Brassfield Formation
