= David Ferry (poet) =

American poet, translator, and educator (1924–2023)

- Born: March 5, 1924; Orange, New Jersey, U.S.
- Died: November 5, 2023 (aged 99); Lexington, Massachusetts, U.S.
- Education: Amherst College; Harvard University
- Occupations: Poet, professor
- Spouse: Anne Ferry
- Writing career
- Genre: poetry
- Notable awards: Lenore Marshall Poetry Prize; Rebekah Johnson Bobbitt National Prize for Poetry; Harold Morton Landon Translation Award; National Book Award

David Russell Ferry (March 5, 1924 – November 5, 2023) was an American poet, translator, and educator. He published eight collections of his poetry and a volume of literary criticism. He won the National Book Award for Poetry for his 2012 collection Bewilderment: New Poems and Translations. He is also known for his English translations of Virgil's works including a complete translation of The Aeneid that he completed at 93 years old. His methodology for this translation was, in his own words, “I have endeavored to make Virgil speak such English as he would himself have spoken if he had been born in England, and in this present age.”

== Biography ==
David Russell Ferry was born in Orange, New Jersey, on March 5, 1924. He attended Columbia High School amid the “wild hills” of suburban Maplewood, New Jersey, where he was raised. His undergraduate education at Amherst College was interrupted by his service in the United States Army Air Force during World War II. He ultimately received his B.A. from Amherst in 1946. He went on to earn his Ph.D. from Harvard University, and it was during his graduate studies that he published his first poems in The Kenyon Review.

From 1952 until his retirement in 1989, Ferry taught at Wellesley College where he was, for many years, the chairman of the English Department. He held the title Sophie Chantal Hart Professor Emeritus of English at Wellesley. He has also taught writing at Boston University, as well as Suffolk University, as a distinguished scholar. Ferry was elected a fellow of the American Academy of Arts and Sciences in 1998, and he was a fellow of the Academy of American Poets.

After his retirement, in 1989, from teaching and administrative duties at Wellesley College he began to focus his efforts more intently on his poetry works.

In 1958, Ferry married the distinguished literary scholar Anne Ferry (died 2006), they had two children, Elizabeth, an anthropologist, and Stephen, a photojournalist. Before moving to Brookline, Massachusetts, Ferry lived across the Charles River in Cambridge, in the house where 19th century journalist and women's rights advocate Margaret Fuller lived before she joined the Brook Farm community.

Ferry died in Lexington, Massachusetts on November 5, 2023, at the age of 99.

== Honors and awards ==
In 2000, Ferry's book of new and selected poems and translations, entitled Of No Country I Know, received the Lenore Marshall Poetry Prize from the Academy of American Poets and the Rebekah Johnson Bobbitt National Prize for Poetry from the Library of Congress (for the best work of poetry for the previous two years). He is the author of a critically praised verse rendering of the Mesopotamian Epic of Gilgamesh. The poet W. S. Merwin has described Ferry's work as having an "assured quiet tone" that communicates "complexities of feeling with unfailing proportion and grace."

Ferry is also a recipient of the Harold Morton Landon Translation Award.

In 2011, Ferry was awarded the Ruth Lilly Poetry Prize.

In 2012, Ferry was awarded the National Book Award for Poetry for his book Bewilderment (University of Chicago Press). Bewilderment was a finalist for the National Book Critics Circle Award (2012, Poetry).

== Poetry and translations ==
David Ferry is well known and regarded in the U.S. for his translations of Gilgamesh, Horace and Virgil. In his original poetry works the poet juxtaposes translations with his own poems in an acknowledgement of influence and tradition. He is supposed to have written with intended elegance, clarity, an avoidance of frills – the Horatian virtues. He has written critically about Wordsworth and always intends to communicate with readers, approaching both translation and original work with a wise passivity, even humility, in pursuit of “the heartbeat easy governance / Of long continued metrical discipline” (‘A Thank-You Note’). This selection draws from his whole oeuvre, including ‘Poem’ (1960) which shows a young poet not wanting to howl or essay a barbaric yawp, but rather stiffly confined to New Formalist and Classical models, to inversion and Romantic lexis.

It was twenty three years before Ferry published his own poems again. ‘In the Garden’ suggests how elegance had now fused with vitality, formal skill with vivid responses to reality. The narrator sits reading Edward Thomas, engaged in “ill-informed staring” and observation nudges the poem forward: “The green of these leaves is almost an absence of green, / And the stalks look like rays of light under water”. Later Ferry poems meander, seem to have little intent on the reader, but brim with details, move like music. He understands the more we attend, whether to language or world, the more we discover we have missed. In ‘That Evening at Dinner’, one of the guests struggles with her “graceless leg, / The thick stocking, the leg brace”. Yet the poem ends by gazing at books on shelves: “Line after line, all of them evenly spaced, / And spaces between the words. You could fall through the spaces.” Here Ferry interpolates lines from Samuel Johnson on “chasms infinitely deep” that lie beneath the surface of things. It is not merely that, as the writer of ‘Old Man’ and ‘The Glory’ must have felt, we do not know these things, but that we do not have the “faculties” to know them.

Ferry alludes to this “something”, elusive partly as the result of the ambivalent gifts of time. ‘Down by the River’ describes a scene's “participial rhythm, // Flowing, enjoying, taking its own sweet time”. The shifting liquidity of water evokes the ineffable, Ferry's real subject. ‘Lake Water’ declares “The plane of the water is like a page on which / Phrases and even sentences are written”. Yet as the poet tries to compose, “The surface of the page is like lake water” and later all is “erased with the changing of the breeze”. These poems are unstable, modern, facing up to the limits of the faulty equipment we are given to understand the world. ‘The Intention of Things’ ponders the idea that “death lives in the intention of things / To have a meaning”.

Ferry's collection, Bewilderment: New Poems and Translations, won the 2012 National Book Award.

In 2017 his translation of Virgil's Aeneid, published at the age of 93, was reviewed by the academic and poet April Bernard in the New York Review of Books. She considered that, "he has some sort of uncanny connection to the great poet [i.e. Virgil ]", and suggested his translation was superior to those of John Dryden, Robert Fitzgerald and Robert Fagles, because of its combination of vivid precision, metrical force, and cumulative effect. Writing in the TLS, classicist Richard Jenkyns called Ferry's Aeneid "the best modern version...both for its loyalty to the original and for its naturalness in itself."

== List of works ==
- The Limits of Mortality: An Essay on Wordsworth's Major Poems Wesleyan University Press, 1959; Literary Licensing, LLC, 2011, ISBN 9781258051549
- On the Way to the Island Wesleyan University Press, 1960, ISBN 9780819520074
- Strangers: A Book of Poems. University of Chicago Press. 1983. ISBN 9780226244709. "David Ferry."
- Gilgamesh: A New Rendering in English Verse Farrar, Straus and Giroux, 1992, ISBN 9780374162276
- Dwelling Places: Poems and Translations. University of Chicago Press. 1993. ISBN 9780226244785.
- The Odes of Horace: A Translation. Macmillan. 1998. ISBN 9780374525729.
- The Eclogues of Virgil Farrar, Straus and Giroux, 2000, ISBN 9780374526962
- Of No Country I Know: New and Selected Poems and Translations. University of Chicago Press. 1999. ISBN 9780226244860. "David Ferry."
- The Georgics of Virgil (2005)
- On This Side of the River: Selected Poems, Between the Lines, 2012, ISBN 9781904130529
- Bewilderment: New Poems and Translations. University of Chicago Press. 2012. ISBN 9780226244884.
- Virgil, The Aeneid. University of Chicago Press. 2017. ISBN 9780226450186
