= Branfield =

Branfield is a surname. Notable people with the surname include:

- Jack Branfield (1891–?), English footballer
- Pip Branfield (born 1952), English bowls player

== See also ==
- Brasfield
