= Cola Franzen =

American writer and translator (1923–2018)

- Born: February 4, 1923
- Died: April 5, 2018 (aged 95)
- Occupations: Writer; translator
- Writing career
- Notable awards: Harold Morton Landon Translation Award (2000); Gregory Kolovakos Award (2004)

Cola Franzen (February 4, 1923 – April 5, 2018) was an American writer and translator.

== Life ==
She published more than twenty books of translations, by notable Spanish and Latin American authors.

She was a member of ALTA (American Literary Translators Association) and vice-president of Language Research, Inc., founded by I.A. Richards, in Cambridge, Massachusetts.

She supported James N. Yamazaki's story publication.

Her work has appeared in Two Lines, Puerto del sol, Temblor, New American Writing.

== Awards ==
- 2000 Harold Morton Landon Translation Award
- 2004 Gregory Kolovakos Award from PEN American Center for expansion of Hispanic Literature to an English-language audience

== Works ==
=== Translations ===
- Marjorie Agosín (1984). Brujas Y Algo Más: Witches and Other Things. Latin American Literary Review Press. ISBN 978-0-935480-16-0.
- Marjorie Agosín (1993). Sargazo. White Pine Press. ISBN 978-1-877727-27-6.
- Marjorie Agosín; Isabel Allende; Peter Winn; Peter Kornbluh (2007). "Irma Muller". Tapestries of hope, threads of love. Rowman & Littlefield. ISBN 978-0-7425-4003-3.
- Alicia Borinsky (1998). Dreams of the Abandoned Seducer, a novel. University of Nebraska Press. ISBN 978-0-8032-6144-0.
- Alicia Borinsky The Collapsible Couple/ La pareja desmontable, a book of poems in bilingual translation (2000)
- Alicia Borinsky (2002). All night movie. Northwestern University Press. ISBN 978-0-8101-1954-3.
- Alicia Borinsky (2007). Golpes bajos: instantáneas. University of Wisconsin Press. ISBN 978-0-299-21600-9. "Cola Franzen."
- Juan Cameron (1993). Si regreso/ If I Go Back, poems. Cross-Cultural Communications. ISBN 978-0-89304-742-9.
- Juan Cameron (2010). Last Night the War Ended, poems. Cold Hub Press. ISBN 978-0-473-17832-1.
- Juan Cameron (2011). Invocations to Pincoya in the Country of Rain, poems. Cold Hub Press. ISBN 978-0-473-18727-9.
- Juan Cameron (2013). So we lost paradise, poems. Translators Cola Franzen, Steven F. White, Roger Hickin. Cold Hub Press. ISBN 978-0-473-23324-2.
- Jorge Guillén (1999). Horses in the air and other poems. Translator Cola Franzen. City Lights Books. ISBN 978-0-87286-352-1. "Cola Franzen."
- Claudio Guillén (1993). The Challenge of Comparative Literature. Harvard University Press. ISBN 978-0-674-10687-1.
- Guillermo Núñez (1990). Diary of a Voyage. England: (Dangerous Writers Series/ Spectacular Diseases Press.
- Poems of Arab Andalusia. City Lights Books. 1989. ISBN 978-0-87286-242-5. (reprinted 1995)) based on Emilio García Gómez's Poemas arábigoandaluces.
- Antonio José Ponte (2000). In the cold of the Malecón & other stories. Translators Cola Franzen, Dick Cluster. City Lights Books. ISBN 978-0-87286-374-3. "Cola Franzen."
- Antonio José Ponte (2002). Tales from the Cuban empire. Translators Cola Franzen. City Lights Books. ISBN 978-0-87286-407-8.
- Saúl Yurkievich (2003). Background Noise, Ruido de fondo. Translator Cola Franzen. Catbird Press. ISBN 978-0-945774-58-7.
- Saul Yurkievich (2003). In the Image and Likeness. Translator Cola Franzen. Catbird Press. ISBN 978-0-945774-59-4.
- Saúl Yurkievich (1999). "A Gusto". In Andrei Codrescu; Laura Rosenthal (eds.). Thus spake the Corpse. David R. Godine Publisher. ISBN 978-1-57423-100-7.
