= Charles Martin (poet) =

American poet (born 1942)

Charles Martin (born 1942, New York City) is a poet, critic and translator. He grew up in the Bronx. He graduated from Fordham University and received his Ph.D. from the University at Buffalo, The State University of New York. He now teaches at Queensborough Community College of the City University of New York, Syracuse University, and the Stonecoast MFA Program at the University of Southern Maine. Martin's specialty is Latin poetry. Martin is also a New Formalist, and was an original faculty member of the West Chester University Poetry Conference.

== Honors and awards ==
He received the Poetry Foundation's Beth Hokin Prize in 1970. His poem, "Against a Certain Kind of Ardency," was in the 2001 Pushcart Prize collection, and in 2005 he won the American Academy of Arts and Letters' Award for Literature. Martin's Ovid literary translation won the 2004 Harold Landon Translation Award from the Academy of American Poets.

== Published works ==
Full-length poetry collections

- Passages from Friday: Poems. Abattoir Editions, University of Nebraska at Omaha. 1983. ISBN 978-0-317-40788-4.
- Steal the Bacon. Johns Hopkins University Press. 1987. ISBN 978-0-8018-3493-6.
- What the Darkness Proposes. Johns Hopkins University Press. 1996. ISBN 978-0-8018-5487-3.
- Starting from Sleep: New & Selected Poems. Harry N. Abrams. 2002. ISBN 978-1-58567-272-1.
- Signs & Wonders. Johns Hopkins University Press. 2011. ISBN 978-0-8018-9974-4.
- Future Perfect. Johns Hopkins University Press. 2018. ISBN 978-1-4214-2535-1.
- The Khayyam Suite. Johns Hopkins University Press. 2025. ISBN 978-1-4214-5071-1.

Critical works

- Catullus: A Critical Edition. University of North Carolina Press. 1978. ISBN 978-0-807-81323-2.

Translations

- Catullus (1990). The Poems of Catullus. Johns Hopkins University Press. ISBN 978-0-8018-3926-9.
- Ovid (2005). Ovid's Metamorphoses. W. W. Norton & Company. ISBN 978-0-393-07243-3.
- Vyasa (2013). The Bhagavad Gita: A New Translation. W. W. Norton & Company. ISBN 978-0-393-34513-1.
