= Edward A. Snow =

American poet and translator

- Education: Rice University; University of California, Riverside; University at Buffalo (PhD)
- Occupations: Poet; translator
- Writing career
- Notable awards: Harold Morton Landon Translation Award (1985); PEN Award for Poetry in Translation (1997)

Edward A. Snow is an American poet and translator.

== Life ==
He graduated from Rice University, University of California, Riverside, and State University of New York at Buffalo, in 1969 with a Ph.D.

He is a professor of English at Rice University, and lives in Houston, Texas.

== Awards ==
- 1985 Harold Morton Landon Translation Award
- Academy of Arts and Letters Award for the body of his Rilke translations
- 1997 PEN Award for Poetry in Translation

== Bibliography ==
=== Translations ===
- Rainer Maria Rilke (2004). Sonnets to Orpheus. North Point Press. ISBN 978-0-86547-611-0.
- Rainer Maria Rilke (2000). Duino Elegies. North Point Press. ISBN 978-0-86547-546-5.
- Rainer Maria Rilke (1996). Uncollected Poems. North Point Press. ISBN 978-0-86547-482-6.
- Rainer Maria Rilke (1991). The Book of Images. North Point Press. ISBN 978-0-86547-468-0.
- Rainer Maria Rilke (1987). New Poems [1908]: The Other Part. North Point Press. ISBN 978-0-86547-271-6.
- Rainer Maria Rilke (1984). New Poems [1907]. North Point Press. ISBN 978-0-86547-415-4.
- Rainer Maria Rilke (2022). The Notebooks of Malte Laurids Brigge [1910]. W W Norton. ISBN 978-0-39388-208-7.

=== Non-fiction ===
- A Priest to the Temple: Or The Country Parson, his Character and Rule of Life (1952)
- Inside Bruegel. North Point Press. 1997. ISBN 978-0-86547-527-4.
- A Study of Vermeer. University of California Press. 1979. ISBN 978-0-520-07132-2. (revised and expanded, 1994)

== Reviews ==
“Though Freedman's biography may muffle Rilke's voice, it comes through like a ringing glass in Uncollected Poems, translated by Edward Snow, who over the years has given readers without German award-winning versions of The Book of Images (1905) and New Poems (1907-1908). Snow is, with Stephen Mitchell and David Young, among the most trustworthy and exhilarating of Rilke's contemporary translators.”
