= Pessoa: A Biography =

Biographical book

- Cover of the 2021 Liveright Publishing edition
- Author: Richard Zenith
- Language: English
- Publication date: 2021

Pessoa: A Biography is a biography of Portuguese writer Fernando Pessoa by Richard Zenith. It was published in 2021 in New York by Liveright Publishing Corporation. It was also published as Pessoa: An Experimental Life in 2021 in London by Allen Lane.

== Critical reception ==
The book was reviewed by Brinda Bose in Telegraph India, Parul Sehgal and Benjamin Moser in The New York Times, David Sexton in The Sunday Times, Peter Conrad in The Guardian, and Anahid Nersessian in The New York Review of Books.

== Accolades ==
The book was selected as one of the best biographies of 2021 by Kirkus Reviews, and as one of The New York Times Critics' Top Books of 2021. It was a finalist for 2022 Pulitzer Prize for Biography or Autobiography.
