= Claire Malroux =

French poet, essayist and translator (1925–2025)

- Born: Josette Andrée Malroux; 3 September 1925; Albi, France
- Died: 4 February 2025 (aged 99); Sèvres, France
- Education: École Normale Supérieure
- Occupations: Poet, translator
- Writing career
- Language: French
- Notable awards: Chevalier de la Légion d’honneur

Claire Malroux (3 September 1925 – 4 February 2025) was the pen name of French poet, essayist and translator Josette Andrée Malroux. Malroux published a dozen poetry collections and also served as the French translator for notable American poets such as Emily Dickinson and Wallace Stevens. Malroux's own poetry has been translated into English by Marilyn Hacker.

== Background ==
Malroux was born on 3 September 1925 in France in Albi, Tarn département. She studied at the École Normale Supérieure in Paris. Malroux was a teenager during World War II. Her father was Augustin Malroux, a socialist, teacher and member of the French Resistance, which led to his arrest, deportation and death during the war.

Malroux died in Sèvres on 4 February 2025, at the age of 99.

== Career ==
Malroux published 12 volumes of poetry, in addition to two "hybrid prose works." Four of those volumes (Edge, A Long-Gone Sun, Birds and Bison and Daybreak) have been translated into English by Hacker. Her 1998 work Soleil de jadis: recit poeme tells the story of World War II from a child's perspective through poetry.

Malroux translated the works of numerous English-language poets into French, but cited Emily Dickinson as one of the most impactful, describing it as the "awakening of a personal affinity." In 1999, she was awarded the title of Chevalier de la Légion d’honneur for her translation work.
