= Dudley Fitts =

American teacher, critic, poet, and translator (1903–1968)

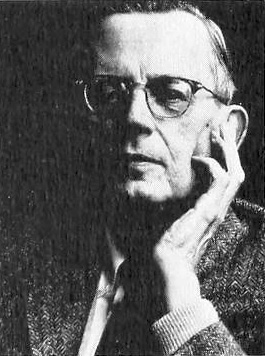
Dudley Fitts c. 1965

Dudley Fitts (April 28, 1903 – July 10, 1968) was an American teacher, critic, poet, and translator. He was born in Boston, Massachusetts, and attended Harvard University, where he edited the Harvard Advocate. He taught at The Choate School 1926–1941 and at Phillips Academy at Andover 1941–1968. He and his former student at Choate, Robert Fitzgerald, published translations of Alcestis of Euripides (1936), Antigone of Sophocles (1939), Oedipus Rex (1949), and The Oedipus Cycle (1949). Their translations were praised for their clarity and poetic equality.

He died in Andover, Massachusetts.

== Bibliography ==
• Poems 1929–1936, Dudley Fitts-Publisher: New Directions, Norfolk, Conn. 1937

- Aristophanes: Four Comedies (ISBN 0-15-602765-8) – Publisher: Harcourt – Date: 1 January 2003
- Four Greek Plays: Agamemnon of Aeschylus/Oedipus Rex of Sophocles/Alcestis of Euripides/Birds of Aristophanes (ISBN 0-15-602795-X) Editor: Dudley Fitts – Publisher: Harcourt – 2002
- From the Greek Anthology: Poems in English Paraphrase – Publisher: Faber and Faber, 1957.
