= Eamon Grennan =

Irish poet (born 1941)

Eamon JR Grennan
- Born: Ireland
- Education: University College, Dublin; Harvard

Eamon JR Grennan (born 13 November 1941) is an Irish poet born in Dublin, Ireland. He completed a BA in 1963 and an MA in 1964 at University College Dublin. He has lived in the United States, except for brief periods, since 1964. He was the Dexter M. Ferry Jr. Professor of English at Vassar College until his retirement in 2004.

== Biography ==
Though his Irish roots are clear in his poetry, Grennan has an international sense of literary tradition. He has cited as influences American poets including Robert Frost and Elizabeth Bishop (herself an international poet with ties to the U.S., Canada, and Brazil). In addition to writing poetry, he has translated Giacomo Leopardi and—with his wife, Vassar classicist Rachel Kitzinger—Sophocles's Oedipus at Colonus.

Grennan studied English and Italian at University College, Dublin, where he met poets Derek Mahon and Eavan Boland, and at Harvard University, and began teaching at Vassar in 1974. He returned to Ireland briefly, first in 1977 and later in 1981, and began writing poetry there. His first book, Wildly for Days, was published in 1983. Gaelic poetry became an important influence, particularly, he has said, on the sound of his poems. At the same time, he was interested in the sentence as a poetic unit as well as a prose unit. In an interview with Timothy Cahill, Grennan said:

I have, it's a toothache quality, a kind of pain -- the ambition to make a sentence that is full, that has not gone limp, hasn't stopped while it still has some elasticity in it.

Grennan's career has been long, productive and distinguished, and he has earned from fellow poets a reputation for lyrical skill and psychological intensity. Former U.S. Poet Laureate Billy Collins said of Grennan:

Few poets are as generous as Eamon Grennan in the sheer volume of delight his poems convey, and fewer still are as attentive to the marvels of the earth. To read him is to be led on a walk through the natural world of clover and cricket and, most of all, light, and to face with an open heart the complexity of being human.

He received the PEN Award for Poetry in Translation in 1998. Grennan was nominated for the 2008 Poetry Now Award for his collection, Out of Breath.

== Poetry ==
Collections

- Wildly for Days. Dublin: Gallery Press, 1983.
- What Light There Is. Gallery Books, Ireland, 1987.
- Cat Scat. North Point Press, 1988.
- Twelve Poems. San Francisco: Occasional Works, 1988.
- What Light There Is and Other Poems. New York: North Point Press, 1989.
- As If It Matters. Gallery Books, Ireland, 1991.
- As If It Matters. St. Paul, MN: Graywolf, 1992.
- So It Goes. St. Paul, MN: Graywolf, 1995.
- So It Goes. Gallery Books, Ireland, 1995.
- Relations: New & Selected Poems. St. Paul, MN: Graywolf, 1998.
- Provincetown Sketches. Aralia Press, 2000.
- Selected & New Poems. Dublin: Gallery Press, 2000.
- Still Life with Waterfall. Gallery Books, Ireland, 2001.
- Still Life with Waterfall. St. Paul, MN: Graywolf, 2002.
- Renvyle, Winter. Philadelphia: Pointed Press, 2003.
- The Quick of It. Gallery Books, Ireland, 2004.
- The Quick of It. St. Paul, MN: Graywolf, 2005.
- Out of Breath. Gallery Books, Ireland, 2007.
- Matter of Fact. St. Paul, MN: Graywolf, 2008.
- Out of Sight: New & Selected Poems. Minneapolis, MN: Graywolf, 2010.
- But the Body. Gallery Books, Ireland, 2012.
- There Now. Gallery Books, Ireland, 2015
- There Now. Minneapolis, MN: Graywolf, 2016.
- Plainchant. Gallery Books, Ireland, 2020.
- Plainchant. Red Hen, 2022.
- Of Shards and Tatters. Gallery Books, Ireland, 2024.

Translations

- Selected Poems of Giacomo Leopardi. Trans. Princeton: Lockert Library of Poetry in Translation, Princeton University Press, 1997.
- Sophocles, Oedipus at Colonus. Trans. with Rachel Kitzinger. Oxford, 2004.

List of poems

Title	Year	First published	Reprinted/collected
Soul music : the Derry Air	1985	Grennan, Eamon (14 January 1985). "Soul music : the Derry Air". The New Yorker. 60 (48): 32.	

== Anthologies edited ==
- Facing the Music: Irish Poetry in the Twentieth Century. Omaha: Creighton University Press, 1999.
- Nine Irish Plays for Voices. Fordham University Press, 2023.
