= Saralyn R. Daly =

American writer and translator (1924–2018)

- Born: Saralyn Ruth Daly; May 11, 1924; Huntington, West Virginia, U.S.
- Died: August 1, 2018 (aged 94); Tujunga, California, U.S.
- Occupations: Professor; writer; translator
- Awards: Harold Morton Landon Translation Award; 1980 The Book of True Love

Academic background
- Education: Ohio State University
- Thesis: The Historye of the Patriarks (1950)
- Doctoral advisor: Francis Utley

Saralyn Ruth Daly (May 11, 1924 – August 1, 2018) was an American writer and translator.

== Early life and career ==
Saralyn Ruth Daly was born on May 11, 1924, in Huntington, West Virginia. She earned a Ph.D. from Ohio State University in English in 1950. The title of her doctoral dissertation was "The Historye of the Patriarks". After graduation she joined the faculty at Midwestern State University (then Midwestern University) in the early 1950s.

Daly was a professor at California State University, Los Angeles from 1962 to 1988, and is now Professor Emerita. During her tenure she received the outstanding professor award in the College of Arts and Letters at California State University, Los Angeles for the 1979–1980 academic year. She was also a professor of linguistics at Texas Tech University.

== Personal life and death ==
Daly lived in Tujunga, California. She died there from pneumonia and complications of leukemia, on August 1, 2018, at the age of 94.

== Awards ==
- 1980 Harold Morton Landon Translation Award

== Works ==
Her work appears in A Shout in the Street, Beyond Baroque, Bywords, Descant, Epos, Western Humanities Review.

=== Translations ===
- Juan Ruiz (1978). Anthony N. Zahareas (ed.). Book of True Love. translated Saralyn R. Daly. Pennsylvania State University Press. ISBN 978-0-271-00523-2.
- In the Web (Fawcett Books, 1978)
- Love's Joy, Love's Pain (Ballantine Books, 1983)

=== Criticism ===
- "'A Worn Path' Retrod". Studies in Short Fiction. 1 (2): 133–39. Winter 1964.
- Katherine Mansfield. New York: Twayne Publishers. 1965. ISBN 0-8057-1372-7.
