= PEN Award for Poetry in Translation =

- Country: United States
- Presented by: PEN America (formerly PEN American Center)
- Eligibility: Published in the U.S. in the preceding year. Translators may be of any nationality.
- Reward: $3,000
- Website: https://pen.org/literary-awards/pen-award-poetry-translation/

The PEN Award for Poetry in Translation is given by PEN America (formerly PEN American Center) to honor a poetry translation published in the preceding year. The award should not be confused with the PEN Translation Prize. The award is one of many PEN awards sponsored by International PEN in over 145 PEN centers around the world. The PEN American Center awards have been characterized as being among the "major" American literary prizes. The award was called one of "the most prominent translation awards."

== Guidelines ==
The $3,000 award is given to a book-length translation of poetry into English published in the United States the previous year. Up to two translators may work on the book. Translators may be of any nationality.

== Winners ==
PEN Award for Poetry in Translation winners
Year	Translator	Title	Poet	Publisher	Ref.
1996	Guy Davenport	7 Greeks	Various poets	New Directions	
1997	Edward Snow	Uncollected Poems	Rainer Maria Rilke	Farrar, Straus and Giroux	
1998	Eamon Grennan	Selected Poems	Giacomo Leopardi	Princeton University Press	
1999	Richard Zenith	Fernando Pessoa & Co.: Selected Poems	Fernando Pessoa	Grove Atlantic	
2000	James Brasfield	The Selected Poems of Oleh Lysheha	Oleh Lysheha	Harvard Ukrainian Research Institute	
2001	Chana Bloch and Chana Kronfeld	Open Closed Open	Yehuda Amichai	Harcourt	
2002	Anne Twitty	Islandia	Maria Negroni	Station Hill	
2003	Khaled Mattawa	Without an Alphabet, Without a Face: Selected Poems of Saadi Youssef	Saadi Youssef	Graywolf Press	
2004	Peter Cole	J'Accuse	Aharon Shabtai	New Directions	
2005	Pierre Joris	Lightduress	Paul Celan	Green Integer	
2006	Wilson Baldridge	Recumbents	Michel Deguy	Wesleyan	
2007	David Hinton	The Selected Poems of Wang Wei	Wang Wei	New Directions	
2008	Rosmarie Waldrop	Lingos I - X	Ulf Stolterfoht	Burning Deck Press	
2009	Marilyn Hacker	King of a Hundred Horsemen	Marie Étienne	Farrar, Straus and Giroux	
2010	Anne Carson	An Oresteia: Agamemnon	Aiskhylos	Faber & Faber	
2010	Anne Carson	Elektra	Sophokles	Faber & Faber	
2010	Anne Carson	Orestes	Euripides	Faber & Faber	
2011	Khaled Mattawa	Adonis: Selected Poems	Adunis (born Ali Ahmad Said Esber)	Yale University Press	
2012	Jen Hofer	Negro Marfil/Ivory Black	Myriam Moscona	Les Figues Press	
2013	Molly Weigel	The Shock of the Lenders and Other Poems	Jorge Santiago Perednik	Action Books	
2014	Karen Emmerich and Edmund Keeley	Diaries of Exile	Yannis Ritsos	Archipelago	
2015	Eliza Griswold	I Am the Beggar of the World: Landays from Contemporary Afghanistan		Farrar, Straus and Giroux	
2016	Sawako Nakayasu	The Collected Poems of Chika Sagawa	Chika Sagawa	Canarium Books	
2017	Simon Armitage	Pearl: A New Verse Translation	The Pearl Poet	Liveright/W. W. Norton & Company	
2018	No Award				
2019	Richard Sieburth	A Certain Plume	Henri Michaux	New York Review Books	
2020	Kristin Dykstra and Nancy Gates Madsen	The Winter Garden Photograph	Reina María Rodríguez	Ugly Duckling Presse	
2021	Steve Bradbury	Raised by Wolves: Poems and Conversations	Amang	Phoneme Media	
2022	Jennifer Grotz and Piotr Sommer	Everything I Don’t Know	Jerzy Ficowski		
2023	Daniel Borzutzky	The Loose Pearl	Paula Ilabaca Nuñez	co-im-press	
2024	Patty Crane	The Blue House: Collected Works of Tomas Tranströmer	Tomas Tranströmer	Copper Canyon Press	
2025	Mira Rosenthal	To The Letter	Tomasz Różycki	Archipelago Books	
2026	Michael Martin Shea	Theory of the Voice and Dream	Liliana Ponce	World Poetry Books	

== See also ==
- American poetry
- List of poetry awards
- List of literary awards
- List of years in poetry
- List of years in literature
