= Richard Zenith =

American-Portuguese writer and translator

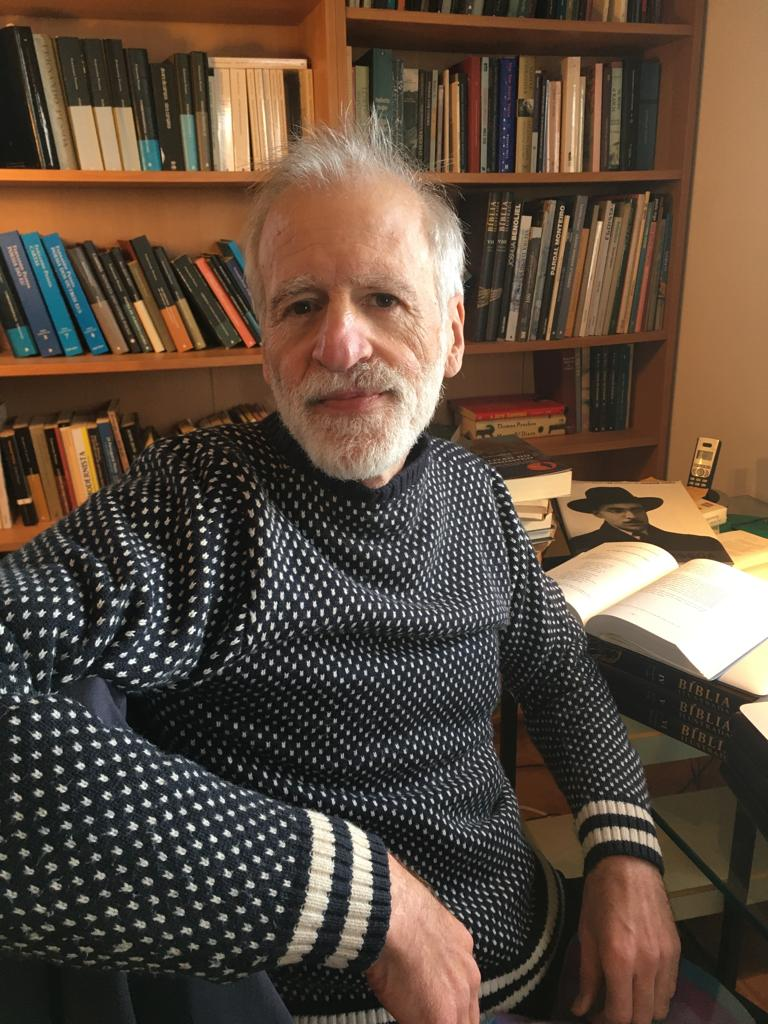
Photo of Richard Zenith by Hanmin Kim

Richard Zenith (born 23 February 1956, Washington, D.C.) is an American-Portuguese writer and translator, winner of the Pessoa Prize in 2012.

== Life ==
Richard Zenith graduated from the University of Virginia in 1979. He has lived in Colombia, Brazil, France and, since 1987, in Portugal. He is a naturalised Portuguese citizen.

Zenith is widely considered to be one of the foremost experts on the Portuguese writer Fernando Pessoa. Zenith has translated many of Pessoa's works into English, including The Book of Disquiet, and he has written extensively about Pessoa's poetry, prose and life. He has also translated Carlos Drummond de Andrade, Antero de Quental, Sophia de Mello Breyner, Nuno Júdice, António Lobo Antunes, and Luís de Camões, amongst other Portuguese-language writers.

Zenith curated, together with Carlos Felipe Moisés, the much acclaimed exhibition Fernando Pessoa, Plural como o Universo, dedicated to Pessoa's life and heteronyms, at Lisbon's Gulbenkian Foundation, São Paulo's Museum of Portuguese Language and Rio de Janeiro's Centro Cultural Correios.

In 2021 Zenith published Pessoa: An Experimental Life, a 1,055-page biography. In the United States it was published as Pessoa: A Biography.

== Awards ==
- 1987 – Guggenheim Fellowship
- 1999 – PEN Award for Poetry in Translation
- 2006 – Harold Morton Landon Translation Award
- 2012 – Prémio Pessoa
- 2022 – Finalist for Pulitzer Prize for Biography or Autobiography for his book Pessoa: A Biography

== Works ==
=== Translations ===
- Fernando Pessoa (2002). The Book of Disquiet. Translator Richard Zenith. Penguin Classics. ISBN 978-0-14-118304-6. (Carcanet 1991 edition)
- Fernando Pessoa (1999). Fernando Pessoa and Co.: Selected Poems. Translator Richard Zenith. Grove Press. ISBN 978-0-8021-3627-5.
- Fernando Pessoa (2002). The Selected Prose of Fernando Pessoa. Translator Richard Zenith. Grove Press. ISBN 978-0-8021-3914-6.
- Antonio Lobo Antunes (2001). The Natural Order of Things. Translator Richard Zenith. Grove Press. ISBN 978-0-8021-3813-2.
- Antonio Lobo Antunes (2004). The Inquisitors' Manual. Translator Richard Zenith. Grove Press. ISBN 978-0-8021-4052-4.
- Antonio Lobo Antunes (1996). Act of the Damned. Translator Richard Zenith. Grove Press. ISBN 978-0-8021-3476-9.
- José Luís Peixoto (2008). The Implacable Order of Things. Translator Richard Zenith. Random House, Inc. ISBN 978-0-385-52446-9.
- Fundação Calouste Gulbenkian (1995). 113 Galician-Portuguese troubadour poems. Translator Richard Zenith. Carcanet. ISBN 978-1-85754-207-3.
- João Cabral de Melo Neto (2005). Education by stone: selected poems. Translator Richard Zenith. Archipelago Books. ISBN 978-0-9749680-1-8.
- Sophia de Mello Breyner Andresen (1997) (January 1997). Log Book: Selected Poems. Translator Richard Zenith. Carcanet. ISBN 978-1-85754-364-3.
- Fernando Pessoa (2005). The Education of the Stoic: The Only Manuscript of the Baron of Teive. Translator Richard Zenith. D.A.P. ISBN 978-1-878972-40-8.
- Antero de Quental (1998). The Feeling of Immortality: Selected Writings. Translator Richard Zenith. Mermaid Turbulence. ISBN 978-1-901776-05-8.
- Nuno Judice (1997). Meditation on Ruins. Translator Richard Zenith. Archangel. ISBN 978-80-901800-8-6.
- Carlos Drummond de Andrade (2015). Multitudinous Heart: Selected Poems: A Bilingual Edition. Translator Richard Zenith. Farrar, Straus and Giroux.

=== Biography ===
- Pessoa: An Experimental Life (2021). Allen Lane (London), released in the U.S. as Pessoa: A Biography, W. W. Norton (New York).

== Reviews ==
As a result, there can be no definitive edition of The Book of Disquiet. Written on and off over a period of more than 20 years, seemingly beginning as a book by another of Pessoa's heteronyms, Vicente Guedes, and slowly evolving into the imaginary testament of Soares, it is a dishevelled album of thoughts, sensations and imagined memories that can never be fully deciphered. Any version is bound to be a construction. In his notes on the text, Richard Zenith recognises this and suggests that readers "invent their own order or, better yet, read the work's many parts in absolutely random order". Despite this disclaimer, readers of Zenith's edition will find it supersedes all others in its delicacy of style, rigorous scholarship and sympathy for Pessoa's fractured sensibility.
