= Marie Étienne =

French poet and novelist

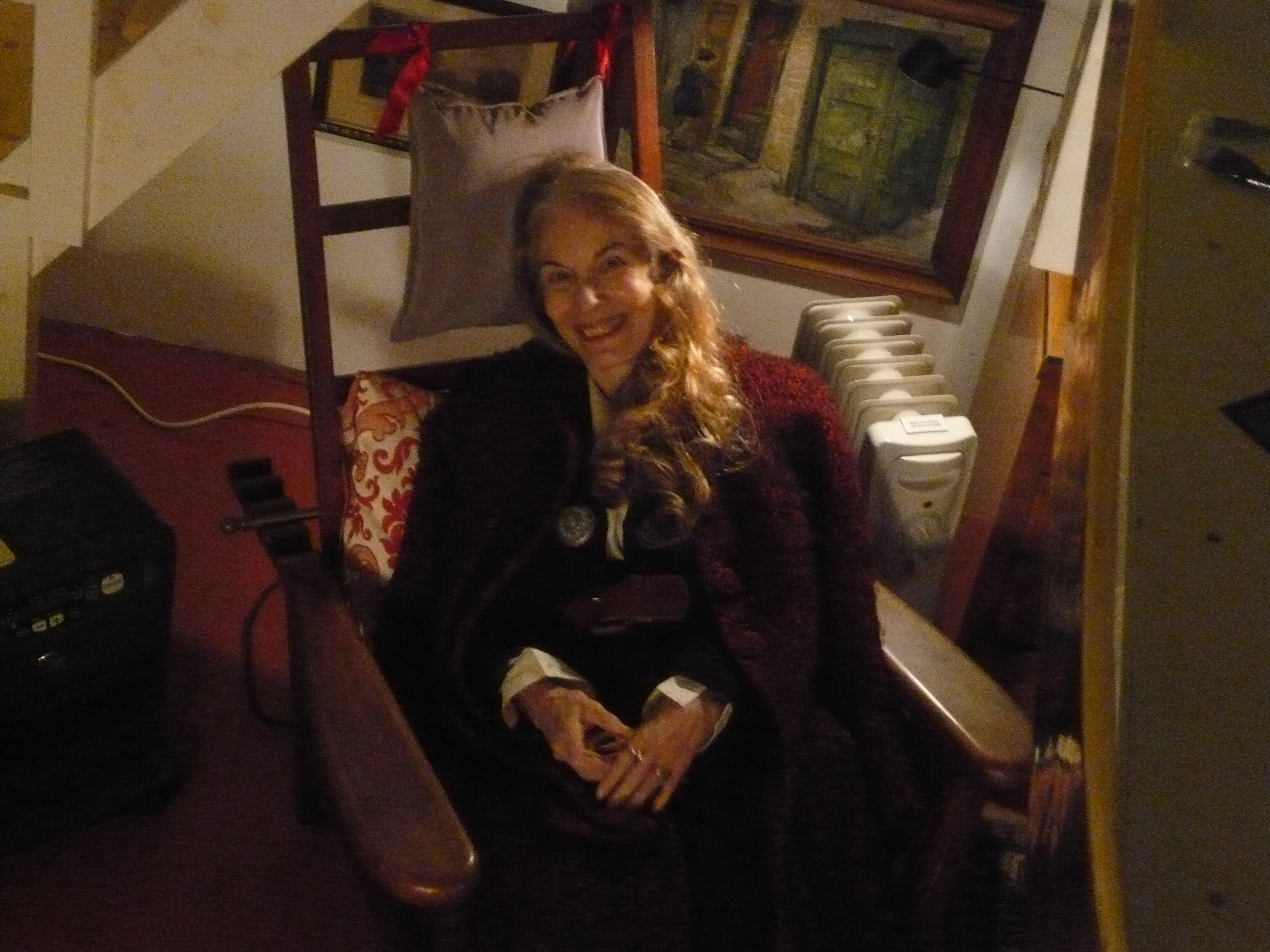
- Born: 1938 (age 87–88); France
- Occupation: Novelist

Marie Étienne is a French poet and novelist. In 2009, her book Roi des cent cavaliers (published in France in 2002) and now translated into English as King of a Hundred Horseman won the PEN Award for Poetry in Translation. Étienne is the author of eleven books of poems and nine books of prose, which her translator Marilyn Hacker says "could be variously classed as fiction, memoir, and cultural history, some partaking of all three".

== Biography ==
From 1979 to 1988, Marie Étienne worked as assistant to the innovative French theater director Antoine Vitez, whose courses on the theater she had followed as part of her doctoral thesis research, at the Théâtre d’Ivry and the Théâtre national de Chaillot. Her work with Vitez, including transcriptions of her notebooks of the era, resulted in Antoine Vitez: Ie roman du théâtre (2000), a book Hacker describes as "in a genre Americans would call literary memoir published a decade after the director’s death and almost twenty years after their collaboration. It offers an invaluable aperçu of a collaborative artistic endeavor and a signal era in contemporary French theater".

She was awarded the Prix Mallarmé for Anatolie in 1997 and the Académie Française's Prix Paul-Verlaine in 2011 for Le Livre des recels and Haute Lice; she also received the Prix Léopold Sedar Senghor for her body of work.

== Awards ==
- 1997 Mallarmé prize
- 2009 PEN Award for Poetry in Translation
- 2023 Prix Littéraire (Académie Française)

== Works ==
- "Ocean / Emotion", Poetry Daily
- Blancs Clos 1977
- Le Point d'Aveugement 1978
- Lettres d'Idumee; precedees de, Peage. Seghers. 1982. ISBN 978-2-221-00996-3.
- Le Sang du Guetteur. Diffusion PUF. 1985. ISBN 978-2-86869-008-1.
- Eloge de la rupture. Ulysse, fin de siecle. 1991. ISBN 978-2-908007-25-1.
- Anatolie. Flammarion. 1997. ISBN 978-2-08-067413-5.
- Senso, la guerre. Balland. 2002. ISBN 978-2-7158-1385-4.
- Antoine Vitez: Le roman du theatre, 1975-1981. Balland. 2000. ISBN 978-2-7158-1274-1.

=== Translations ===
- Marie Etienne (2008). King of a Hundred Horsemen: Poems. Translator Marilyn Hacker. Farrar Straus Giroux. ISBN 978-0-374-53192-8.

=== Anthologies ===
- Mary Ann Caws, ed. (2004). The Yale anthology of twentieth-century French poetry. Yale University Press. ISBN 978-0-300-10010-5.
- Valentina Gosetti, Andrea Bedeschi, Adriano Marchetti, eds. (2017). Donne. Poeti di Francia e Oltre. Dal Romanticismo a Oggi. Giuliano Ladolfi Editore. ISBN 978-88-6644-349-0.

== Reviews ==
Originally published in French in 2002, Marie Étienne’s King of a Hundred Horsemen, translated by Marilyn Hacker, occupies an odd position somewhere between poetry and prose, observation and memory, dramatic enunciation and factual report. Although the opening sequence evokes the Parisian poet’s upbringing in French Indochina, the book is constructed around a deliberate lack of any anchoring subjectivity....

Marilyn Hacker’s translation of Marie Étienne’s eleventh book of poems, King of a Hundred Horsemen, represents an ample first introduction to the work of this restlessly inventive French literary figure.
