= David Hinton =

American poet and translator

- Education: Cornell University
- Occupations: Poet; translator
- Writing career
- Notable awards: Harold Morton Landon Translation Award (1997); PEN Award for Poetry in Translation (2007)
- Website: www.davidhinton.net

David Hinton is an American poet and translator who specializes in Chinese literature and poetry, including Taoist and Buddhist classics. His poems and writing normally focuses on art, nature, Tao, and Chan Buddhism.

== Life ==
Hinton was born in Utah. He studied Chinese at Cornell University, and in Taiwan. He lives in East Calais, Vermont.

== Awards ==
- 1997 Academy of American Poets Harold Morton Landon Translation Award
- fellowship from the Witter Bynner Foundation
- fellowship from the Ingram Merrill Foundation
- fellowship National Endowment for the Arts
- fellowship National Endowment for the Humanities.
- 2003 Guggenheim Fellowship
- 2007 PEN Award for Poetry in Translation
- 2014 American Academy of Arts and Letters, Thorton Wilder Award for Translation

== Works ==
=== Translations ===
- David Hinton (April 19, 2009). "Poet's Choice 'Drinking Wine' by T'ao Ch'ien". The Washington Post.
- "Overnight at Stone-gate Cliffs". Smith College. Archived from the original on 2008-10-12.
- Mountain home: the wilderness poetry of ancient China. New Directions Publishing. 2005. ISBN 978-0-8112-1624-1.
- The Mountain Poems of Hsieh Ling-yun. New Directions. 2001. ISBN 978-0-8112-1489-6. "David Hinton."
- Laozi, Lao zi, Lao-tzu (2000). Tao Te Ching. Counterpoint. ISBN 978-1-58243-047-8.
- The selected poems of Po Chü-I. New Directions Publishing. 1999. ISBN 978-0-8112-1412-4.
- Mencius. Basic Books. 1999. ISBN 978-1-58243-020-1.
- The Analects of Confucius. Counterpoint. 1998. ISBN 978-1-58243-038-6.
- Chuang Tzu: Inner Chapters. Publishers Group West. 1997. ISBN 978-1-887178-34-1.
- The Selected Poems of Lí Po. New Directions. 1996. ISBN 978-0-8112-1323-3. "David Hinton."
- Bei Dao (1996). Landscape Over Zero. New Directions. ISBN 978-0-8112-1334-9.
- The Late Poems of Meng Chiao. Princeton University Press. 1996. ISBN 978-0-691-01236-0.
- Forms of Distance by Bei Dao (1994)
- The Selected Poems of T'ao Ch'ien. Copper Canyon Press. 1993. ISBN 978-1-55659-056-6.
- The Selected Poems of Tu Fu. New Directions Publishing. 1989. ISBN 978-0-8112-1100-0. "David Hinton."
- The Selected Poems of Wang Wei. New Directions Publishing. 2006.
- I Ching: The Book of Change. Farrar, Straus, and Giroux. 2015. ISBN 978-0-374-22090-7.
- No-Gate Gateway: The Original Wu-Men Kuan. Shambhala Publications. 2018. ISBN 978-1-611-80437-9.
- Awakened Cosmos: The Mind of Classical Chinese Poetry. Shambhala Publications. 2019. ISBN 978-1-611-80742-4.

=== Author ===
- Hunger Mountain: A Field Guide to Mind and Landscape. Shambhala Publications. 2012. ISBN 978-1-611-80016-6.
- Existence: A Story. Shambhala Publications. 2016. ISBN 978-1-611-80338-9.
- The Wilds of Poetry: Adventures in Mind and Landscape. Shambhala Publications. 2017. ISBN 978-1-611-80460-7.
- Desert: Poems. Shambhala Publications. 2018. ISBN 978-1-611-80593-2.
- China Root: Taoism, Ch'an, and Original Zen. Shambhala Publications. 2020. ISBN 978-1-611-80713-4.
- The Way of Ch'an: Essential Texts of the Original Tradition. Shambhala Publications. 2023. ISBN 978-1611-80923-7.

=== Editor ===
- Classical Chinese Poetry. Farrar, Straus and Giroux. October 2008. ISBN 978-0-374-10536-5.
