= Andrew Schelling =

American writer (born 1953)

- Born: January 14, 1954 (age 71); Washington, D.C., U.S.
- Occupation: Poet; translator
- Education: University of California, Santa Cruz (BA); University of California, Berkeley
- Notable awards: Harold Morton Landon Translation Award (1992)

Andrew Schelling (born January 14, 1953, in Washington, D.C.) is an American poet and translator.

== Life ==
Schelling grew up in the townships of New England west of Boston. Early influences were the wildlands of New England, and Asian art viewed in the Boston Museum of Fine Arts and Harvard University's Fogg Museum. He moved west to Northern California in 1973, and graduated from University of California, Santa Cruz with a B.A. in Religious Studies in 1975. In Northern California he explored wilderness regions of the Coast Range and Sierra Nevadas. At U.C. Santa Cruz he studied poetry with Norman O. Brown and natural history with Gregory Bateson. In the late 1970s Schelling pursued Sanskrit and Asian literature at the University of California, Berkeley. During the 1980s he lived in the East Bay, and collaborated with poets, Zen practitioners, and ecologists. With the poet Benjamin Friedlander he edited the samizdat poetics journal Jimmy & Lucy's House of "K," and began to publish in such journals as Sulfur, Talisman, Temblor, Sagetrieb, and Poetics Journal. In 1990, he moved to the Southern Rocky Mountains, living in and around Boulder, Colorado, where he joined the faculty at Naropa University. At Naropa he teaches poetry, Sanskrit, and wilderness writing. He has published seventeen books, which include poetry, translation (from the ancient languages of India), and essays.

== Work ==
An ecologist, naturalist, and explorer of wilderness areas, Schelling has travelled in North America, Europe, India, and the Himalayas. His poetry is known for its engagement with the rhythms and elements of the natural world, its use of literary forms derived from traditional Asian literary forms and from International modernism, with a grounding in languages. He is one of the few renowned literary translators into American English of the poetry of ancient and medieval India. Dropping the Bow: Poems of Ancient India, his first volume of translations from Sanskrit and related vernaculars or Prakrits, received the Academy of American Poets translation award in 1992. Two volumes of his essays have appeared, and he has edited several anthologies. The Wisdom Anthology of North American Buddhist Poetry includes a variety of poets, including experimental writers and younger poets. The Oxford Anthology of Bhakti Literature is a survey of the poetry or song (often orally composed and written down years or centuries later) that has been a pan-Indian "genre" for the past 1000 years.

After taking up study of the Arapaho language, a Native American language in the Algonquian family, he wrote From the Arapaho Songbook, a serial poem in 108 stanzas that incorporated words and syntax from Arapaho. The book also delves into natural history and bioregional lore of the Southern Rocky Mountains.

Archives for the two journals Schelling edited with Benjamin Friedlander are housed at U.C. Berkeley's Bancroft Library. Schelling's own literary papers were purchased by the Archive for New Poetry, U.C. San Diego, in 2012.

Schelling lives in Boulder, Colorado.

== Awards ==
- 1992 Harold Morton Landon Translation Award from the Academy of American Poets
- Two grants for translation from the Witter Bynner Foundation for Poetry.

== Works ==
- The India Book: Essays & Translations from Indian Asia. O Books. 1993. ISBN 1-882022-16-5.
- Wild Form, Savage Grammar: Poetry, Ecology, Asia. La Alameda Press. 2003. ISBN 978-1-888809-35-0.
- The Real People of Wind & Rain: Talks, Essays & An Interview. Singing Horse Press, 2014. ISBN 978-0-935162-77-6
- Tracks Along the Left Coast: Jaime de Angulo & Pacific Coast Culture. 2017, Counterpoint Press. ISBN 978-1-61902-925-5

=== Poetry ===
- Old Growth: Poems and Notebooks 1986-1994. Rodent Press. 1995. ISBN 978-1-887289-01-6.
- The Road to Ocosingo. Smokeproof Press. 1998. ISBN 978-0-9658877-3-1.
- Tea Shack Interior: New & Selected Poetry. Talisman House. 2001. ISBN 978-1-58498-027-8.
- Two Elk: A High Country Notebook. Bootstrap Press. 2005. ISBN 0-9711935-4-1.
- Old Tale Road. Empty Bowl Press. 2008. ISBN 978-1-929355-47-1.
- From the Arapaho Songbook. La Alameda Press. 2011. ISBN 978-1-888809-61-9.
- A Possible Bag. Singing Horse Press, 2013. ISBN 978-0-93516250-9

=== Translations ===
- Dropping the Bow: Poems of Ancient India. Translated by Andrew Schelling. Broken Moon Press. 1991. ISBN 978-0-913089-18-7.
- Mīrābāī (1998). For Love of the Dark One: Songs of Mirabai. Translated by Andrew Schelling. Hohm Press. ISBN 978-0-934252-84-3. original 1993
- Songs of the sons & daughters of Buddha. Translated by Andrew Schelling; Anne Waldman. Shambhala. 1996. ISBN 978-1-57062-172-7.
- The Cane Groves of Narmada River: Erotic Poems of Old India. City Lights Publishers. January 1, 2001. ISBN 978-0-87286-346-0.
- Amaru (2004). Erotic love poems from India: a translation of the Amarushataka. Translated by Andrew Schelling. Shambhala Publications. ISBN 978-1-59030-097-8.
- Kamani: from Jayadeva's Gīta-govinda. Emdash Editions, 2007.
- Bright as an Autumn Moon: Fifty Poems from the Sanskrit. University of Hawaii, 2014. 978-0-8248-4092-1

=== Editor ===
- Andrew Schelling, ed. (2005). The Wisdom anthology of North American Buddhist poetry. Wisdom Publications. ISBN 978-0-86171-392-9.
- Anne Waldman; Andrew Schelling, eds. (1994). Disembodied poetics: annals of the Jack Kerouac School. University of New Mexico Press. ISBN 978-0-8263-1517-5.
- Andrew Schelling, ed. The Oxford Anthology of Bhakti Literature. Oxford University Press: Delhi, 2011.
