= Avi Sharon =

American poet

- Education: Emory University; Boston University (PhD)
- Occupations: Poet; professor; translator; consultant
- Children: 2
- Writing career
- Notable awards: Harold Morton Landon Translation Award (2009)

Avi Sharon is a professor of classics, translator and consultant.

== Life ==
He graduated from Emory University, and Boston University, with a Ph.D. in classics, where he studied under Donald Carne-Ross and William Arrowsmith.

His work has appeared in Arion, Partisan Review, Waves, Journal of Modern Greek Studies, Kenyon Review, Yale Review, and International Quarterly.

He works on Wall Street, and lives in Brooklyn, with his wife and two sons.

== Awards ==
- 1996 Alexander S. Onassis Fellowship for scholars of Greek
- 2009 Harold Morton Landon Translation Award
- 2012 The Hellenic Foundation for Culture Translation Prize (Greek)

== Works ==
- Drama as Opera: The Musical Theater of Classical Athens. Boston University. 1994.
- Michael Silk; David Ricks, eds. (2000). "A Hebrew Lament". Dialogos: Hellenic Studies Review. Taylor & Francis. ISBN 978-0-7146-4478-3.

=== Translations ===
- Constantine P. Cavafy (2008). Selected Poems. Avi Sharon. Penguin Group USA. ISBN 978-0-14-118561-3.
- Plato (1998). Plato's symposium. Avi Sharon. Focus. ISBN 978-0-941051-56-9.

=== Anthologies ===
- Nina Kossman, ed. (2001). "Helen". Gods and mortals: modern poems on classical myths. Oxford University Press US. ISBN 978-0-19-513341-7.

=== Criticism ===
- "Cressida Among the Greeks". Greekworks. March 15, 2002. Archived from the original on August 28, 2010.

== Reviews ==
Sharon has achieved an excellent balance, and certainly more so than other editors. More advanced and extensive bibliographies, introductions and/or notes, however, are to be found in the Oxford World's Classics edition of Waterfield, in the SUNY edition of Cobb, and in the Hackett edition. The translation also compares well to its competitors....
