= Grennan (disambiguation) =

Grennan may refer to:

- Grennan, a surname (with a list of people surnamed Grennan)
- Grennan Hill, Scotland
- Thomastown, County Kilkenny, Ireland, originally named Grennan
