= Robert Fitzgerald =

American poet, critic and translator (1910–1985)

- Robert Fitzgerald in 1943, by Walker Evans
- Born: Robert Stuart Fitzgerald; October 12, 1910; Geneva, New York, U.S.
- Died: January 16, 1985 (aged 74); Hamden, Connecticut, U.S.
- Education: Harvard University (BA)

Robert Stuart Fitzgerald (12 October 1910 – 16 January 1985) was an American poet, literary critic and translator whose renderings of the Greek classics "became standard works for a generation of scholars and students". He is best known as a translator of ancient works of Homer and Virgil. He also composed several books of poetry.

== Biography ==
Fitzgerald was born in Geneva, New York, in 1910, in an Irish-American family. Both his parents were actors; his mother died when he was 3, his father when he was 17. He grew up in Springfield, Illinois, and graduated from The Choate School in Wallingford, Connecticut, where he met Dudley Fitts, a poet. He entered Harvard in 1929, and in 1931 a number of his poems were published in Poetry magazine. After graduating from Harvard in 1933 he became a reporter for the New York Herald Tribune for a year.

Later he worked for several years for Time. In 1940, William Saroyan lists him among "associate editors" at Time in the play, Love's Old Sweet Song. Whittaker Chambers mentions him as a colleague in his 1952 memoir, Witness.

In World War II, he served in the U.S. Navy in Guam and Pearl Harbor. Later he was an instructor at Sarah Lawrence and Princeton University, poetry editor of The New Republic. He succeeded Archibald MacLeish as Boylston Professor of Rhetoric and Oratory at Harvard in 1965 and served until his retirement in 1981.

He was a member of the American Academy of Arts and Sciences, and a Chancellor of the Academy of American Poets. From 1984 to 1985 he was appointed Consultant in Poetry to the Library of Congress, a position now known as Poet Laureate Consultant in Poetry, the United States' equivalent of a national poet laureate, but did not serve due to illness. In 1984 Fitzgerald received a L.H.D. from Bates College.

Fitzgerald is widely known as one of the most poetic translators into the English language.

Fitzgerald served as literary executor to Flannery O'Connor, who was a boarder at his home in Redding, Connecticut, from 1949 to 1951. Fitzgerald's wife at the time, Sally Fitzgerald, compiled O'Connor's essays and letters after O'Connor's death.

Fitzgerald was married three times, and had six children. He later moved to Hamden, Connecticut, where he died at his home after a long illness. One of his sons is Benedict Fitzgerald, who co-wrote the screenplay for The Passion of the Christ with Mel Gibson.

== Translations ==
While at Harvard, Fitzgerald acted in Milman Parry's staging of Sophocles. His friend, the poet Dudley Fitts, encouraged Fitzgerald to learn Greek. His first translation from Ancient Greek was of Euripides's Alcestis, done jointly with Fitts by mail. Edith Hamilton called it "the best translation of a Greek play she had ever read".

As early as 1948, in his review of a prose translation of the Odyssey, Fitzgerald argued that poetry "should give us a more recognizable Homer than the prose men can supply" and translated the first lines of the poem.

Fitzgerald recalled that he read Richmond Lattimore's 1951 translation of the Iliad and admired it. He wrote a letter to Lattimore, asking whether he had thought about the Odyssey translation; at the time, Lattimore had no plans to. Fitzgerald then decided to do it himself. He received a Guggenheim Fellowship and, after a talk with Jason Epstein, a contract from Doubleday. The contract gave him "three thousand dollars a year for five years". Fitzgerald moved to Italy with his family, where they lived frugally, "no car, no refrigerator, no radio, no telephone—everything was very simple".

Fitzgerald lived in Italy from 1953; the translation took seven years. He considered living in Italy, on "Homer's sea", to be very important for his work on the translation. He traveled to Ithaca to get a sense of place and, as he recalled later, he found Homer's wine-dark sea there.

Among Fitzgerald's translation principles were the avoidance of Latinisms (in contrast to Pope and Chapman) as he wanted to show the "Greekness of the thing", and usage of "fully alive" English (by this he meant using only colloquialisms "worthy to be immortal", and not some passing slang). Fitzgerald later described his working routine in an interview:

I had this whole routine worked out while doing the Homer. I wrote out every line of Greek in my own hand, book by book, a big notebook for each book. One line to two blank lines. As I went through the Greek and copied it out in my own hand, I would face the difficulties—any crux that turned up, questions of interpretation—and try to work them out. I accumulated editions with notes and so on as I went along. So before I was through, I had acquired some of the scholarship that was relevant to my problems. But always, in the end, it was simply the Greek facing me, in my own hand, in my own notebook.

Fitzgerald taught Homer, Virgil, and Dante at Harvard for many years since the 1960s, requiring students who took his course to be fluent in at least two of the three languages of the poems. As the poet Dana Gioia recalled, Fitzgerald had his students memorize all characters of the poems, including minor ones: he thought that great poets introduced only significant characters into their works.

== Bibliography ==
=== Translations ===
- Euripides (1936). The Alcestis of Euripides. Translators Dudley Fitts, Robert Fitzgerald. Harcourt, Brace and Company.
- Sophocles (1951). Oedipus Rex. Translators Dudley Fitts, Robert Fitzgerald. Faber and Faber.
- Sophocles (1954). Oedipus the King; Oedipus at Colonus; Antigone. Translators David Grene, Robert Fitzgerald, Elizabeth Wyckoff. University of Chicago Press.
- Homer's The Odyssey. Farrar, Straus and Giroux. 1961.
  - Homer (1965). The Odyssey. Translator Robert Fitzgerald. Houghton Mifflin Company.
  - Homer (1998). The Odyssey. Translator Robert Fitzgerald. Farrar, Straus and Giroux. ISBN 978-0-374-22438-7.
- Homer (1974). The Iliad. Doubleday.
  - Homer (1998). The Iliad. Translator Robert Fitzgerald. Oxford University Press. ISBN 978-0-19-283405-8.
- Virgil (1983). The Aeneid. Translator Robert Fitzgerald. Random House. ISBN 0-394-52827-1.
- Paul Valery, Three Verse Plays (1960)
- St. John Perse, Chronique and Birds (1965)

=== Poems ===
- Poems. Arrow Editions. 1935.
- A Wreath for the Sea. Arrow editions. 1943.
- In the Rose of Time: Poems, 1931-1956. New Directions. 1956. ISBN 978-0-8112-0279-4.
- Spring Shade: Poems, 1931-1970. New Directions. 1971. ISBN 978-0-8112-0052-3.

=== Editor ===
- Robert Fitzgerald, ed. (1969). The Collected Poems of James Agee. Calder and Boyars. ISBN 978-0-7145-0887-0.
- James Agee (1976). Robert Fitzgerald (ed.). The Collected Short Prose of James Agee. Cherokee Publishing Company. ISBN 978-0-87797-302-7.
- Flannery O'Connor (1969). Sally Fitzgerald, Robert Fitzgerald (ed.). Mystery and manners: occasional prose. Macmillan. ISBN 978-0-374-50804-3.
- Flannery O'Connor (1965). Sally Fitzgerald, Robert Fitzgerald (ed.). Everything that rises must converge. Macmillan. ISBN 978-0-374-50464-9.

== Awards and honors ==
- 1961: the Bollingen Prize for the translation of the Odyssey
- 1976: Harold Morton Landon Translation Award for the Iliad
- The Robert Fitzgerald Translation Prize was established in 1985, awarded "to the winners of a competition for the best literary translations from any language into English" at Boston University
