= Alicia Borinsky =

US-based Argentine novelist, poet and literary critic

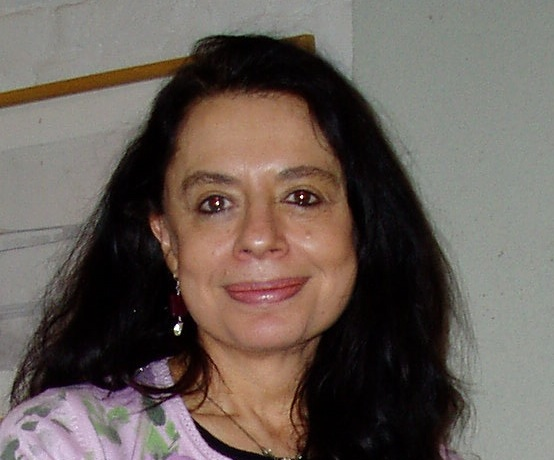

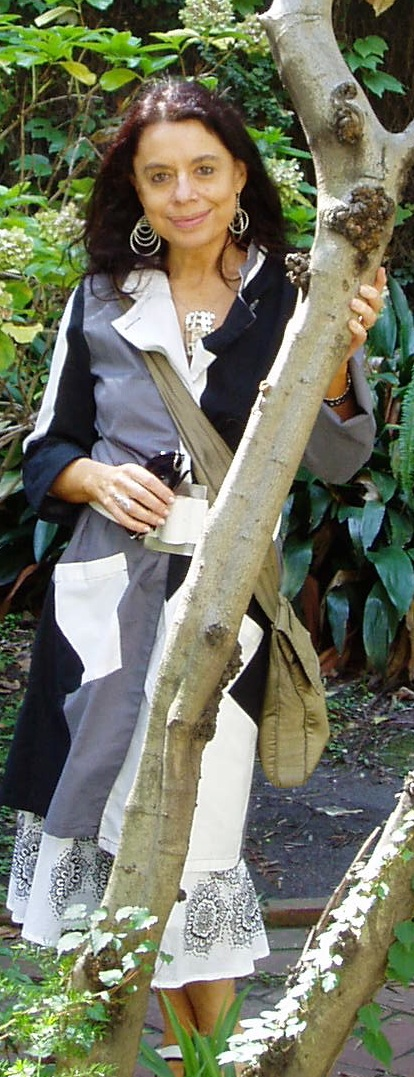

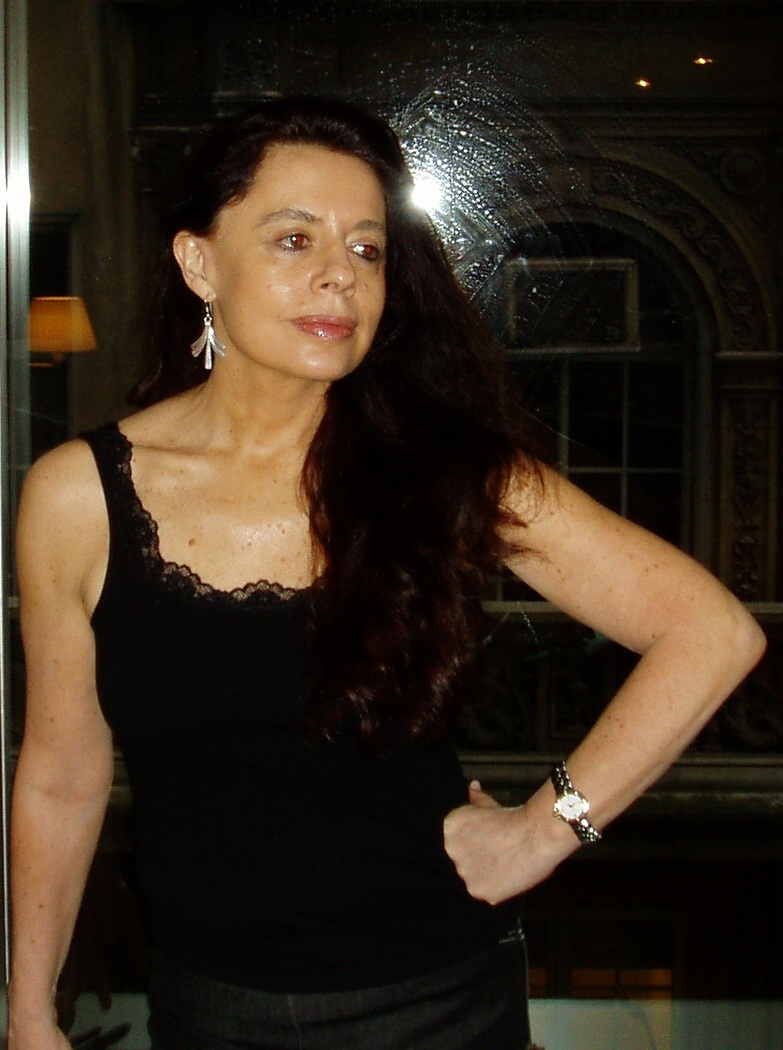

Alicia Borinsky (born in Buenos Aires), is a US-based Argentine novelist, poet and literary critic. Alicia Borinsky is professor of Latin American and Comparative Literature and Director of the Writing in the Americas Program at Boston University. Her critical work has helped frame the discussion about the writers of the Latin American Boom or Boom latinoamericano, an important movement in Latin American literature. Among her other scholarly achievements is the introduction of the figure of Macedonio Fernández—Borges’s master—to a wider reading public, the exploration of the intersection between literary theory, cultural and gender studies and numerous works about poetry, Latino writers and World literature. Borinsky was named to the Academia Norteamericana de la Lengua Española (ANLE) and awarded the "Enrique Anderson Imbert Prize" in recognition of her lifelong dedication to Arts and Literature."

== Published works ==
- La ventrílocua y otras canciones (Buenos Aires: Cuarto Poder, 1975).
- Epistolario de Macedonio Fernández (Buenos Aires: Ed. Corregidor, 1976). Reprinted 2000.
- Ver/Ser Visto: Notas para una analítica poética (Barcelona: Ed. Bosch, 1978).
- Intersticios: estudios críticos de literatura hispana (Veracruz [México]. Universidad Veracruzana, 1986).
- Mujeres tímidas y la Venus de China (Buenos Aires: Corregidor, 1987).
- Macedonio Fernández y la teoría crítica: una evaluación (Buenos Aires: Corregidor, 1987).
- Mina cruel, (Buenos Aires: Corregidor, 1989).
- Tìmorous Women. (trans. of Mujeres tímidas), (Peterborough, Cambs: Paul Green Press, 1992).
- Mean Woman ( trans.of Mina cruel), Lincoln: University of Nebraska Press, 1993.
- Theoretical Fables: The Pedagogical Dream in Latin-American Fiction (University of Pennsylvania Press, 1993).
- La pareja desmontable (Buenos Aires: Corregidor, 1994) .
- Sueños del seductor abandonado. (Buenos Aires: Corregidor, 1995)
- Madres Alquiladas (Buenos Aires: Corregidor, 1996)
- Cine Continuado, (Buenos Aires: Corregidor: 1997). (English trans. All Night Movie at Northwestern University Press, 2002)
- Dreams of the Abandoned Seducer (trans. of Sueños del seductor abandonado), (Lincoln: The University of Nebraska Press) 1998. Translated into English in collaboration with Cola Franzen
- Golpes bajos (Buenos Aires: Corregidor 1999) (published in English as Low Blows by University of Wisconsin Press in 2007)
- La pareja desmontable/ The Collapsible Couple (bilingual edition) (London, Middlesex University Press), 2000.
- All Night Movie (trans.of Cine continuado), Northwestern University Press, 2002.
- La mujer de mi marido (Buenos Aires, Corregidor: 2000).
- Las ciudades perdidas van al paraíso (Buenos Aires: Corregidor, November 2003)
- Golpes bajos/Low Blows (bilingual edition), University of Wisconsin Press, March 2007. Preface by Michael Wood. Translated by Cola Franzen with the author.
- Frívolas y pecadoras (bilingual, poetry). (Chicago: Swan Isle Press, 2008). Translated by Cola Franzen and the author.
- Las ciudades perdidas van al paraíso / Lost cIties go to Paradise (bilingual edition). Chicago: Swan Isle Press, 2015. Translated by Regina Galasso with the author.
- My Husband's Woman / La mujer de marido (bilingual edition). Literal Publishing, 2016. Translated by Natasha Hakimi Zapata with the author.

== Critical reception of her work ==
Alicia Borinsky has won several awards for her work, including the Latino Literature Prize in 1996 and a Guggenheim Fellowship in 2001. Literary critic and Professor of English at Princeton University, Michael Wood, said of Low Blows, "Low Blows is a book of surprises, full of turns of language and imagination which constantly catch us off guard. This is why it is so strange that we should finally know where we are, and why we are lucky to make it back to the once familiar world. We are so used to solemn failures of sight that we scarcely know what to do with lightness of glance and many-angled vision." Peter Bush, Director of the Centre for Literary Translation, writes, "No one else writing today can quite emulate her cartoon prose, a shotgun marriage of comic and camp, the Borgesian and the Barthesian." Acclaimed Argentine author of Santa Evita Tomas Eloy Martinez, writes, "Alicia Borinsky is unique, with an Argentine ear perfectly attuned to tangos and boleros...Her All Night Movie renews and transforms the genre of the picaresque novel. Borinsky is the reincarnation of Macedonio Fernandez and Julio Cortazar, as a daring and seductive storyteller in skirts." Argentine author Luisa Valenzuela writes, of Dreams of the Abandoned Seducer,The reward does not consist in the suspension of disbelief. It consists in another belief that will open wide the doors for us to go out and play." Marguerite Feitlowitz, Professor of literature at Bennington College, author of "A Lexicon of Terror: Argentina and the Legacies of torture" is quoted in the back cover of "Golpes bajos/Low Blows" Madison: The University of Wisconsin Press, March 2007 saying that "No one working today writes like Alicia Borinsky, whose words explode off the page. The voices in her work arise organically, and their accents and articulations, textures and quirks, are integral, authentic. Each of these voices (and there are scores) has its own palpable history: we feel it, even when its detailed particulars are withheld".

The Archives and Special Collections at Amherst College holds some of her papers.
