= Greenan (surname) =

Greenan is a surname. Notable people with the surname include:

- Gerard Greenan (born 1950), Canadian politician
- Laurie Greenan (1947–2020), American costume designer
- Russell H. Greenan (1925–2023), American author
- Sinead Greenan (born 1992), Irish cyclist
- Terisa Greenan (born 1967), American film producer, director, writer, and actress
