= Oleh Lysheha =

Ukrainian poet, playwright, translator and intellectual (1949 – 2014)

- Олег Лишега
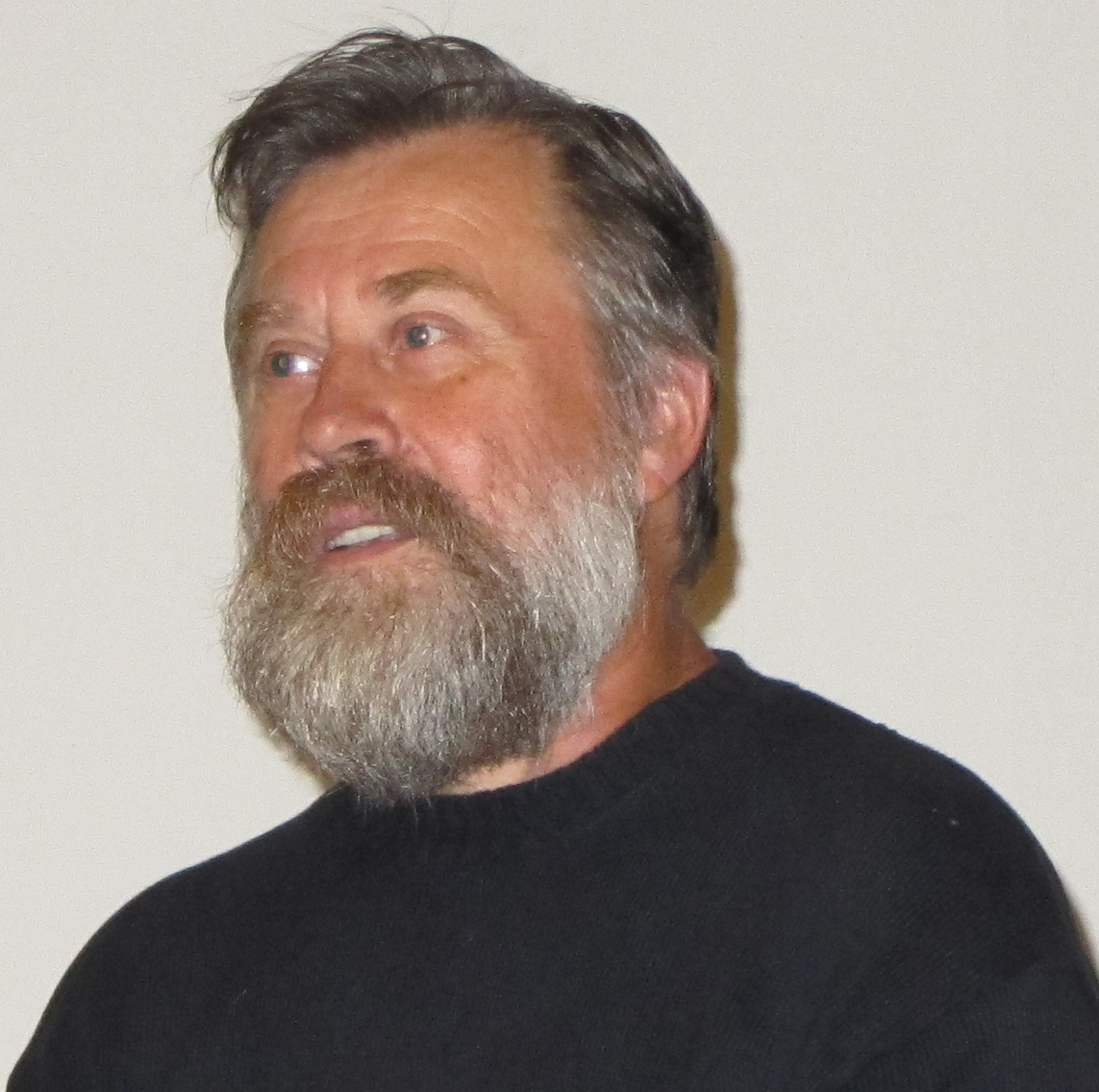
- Born: 30 October 1949; Tysmenytsia, Ukrainian SSR
- Died: 17 December 2014 (aged 65); Kyiv, Ukraine
- Occupations: Poet, translator

Oleh Lysheha (Ukrainian: Олег Лишега; 30 October 1949 – 17 December 2014) was a Ukrainian poet, playwright, translator and intellectual. Lysheha entered Lviv University in 1968, where during his last year, he was expelled for his participation in an "unofficial" literary circle, Lviv Bohema. As punishment, Lysheha was drafted into the Soviet army and internally exiled. During the period 1972-1988, he was banned from official publication, but in 1989 his first book Great Bridge (Velykyi Mist) was published. For "The Selected Poems of Oleh Lysheha," Lysheha and his co-translator James Brasfield from Penn State University, received the 2000 PEN Award for Poetry in Translation published by the Harvard Ukrainian Research Institute. Lysheha is the first Ukrainian poet to receive the PEN award.

== Life ==
Oleh Lysheha was born in 1949 to a family of teachers in Tysmenytsia, a Carpathian village in Ivano-Frankivsk Oblast, Ukraine. Twenty years later, Lysheha became a student studying foreign languages at the University of Lviv named after the renowned Ukrainian poet Ivan Franko. In 1972, Lysheha was expelled and drafted to the Soviet army for membership in Lviv Bohema, a dissident group of artists at Lviv University. After serving in the military, the poet returned to his birthplace, working at a local factory.

Then, Lysheha returned to Lviv, and soon thereafter moved to Kyiv where he married. In his position as a technical employee at the Kyiv Theatrical Institute of Karpenko Karyi, Lysheha continued to write poems and translate. From 1997–98, Oleh Lysheha was a Visiting Fulbright Scholar to Penn State in Pennsylvania, United States. After his return to Ukraine, Lysheha worked on poetry, painting and sculpture, as well as resumed his seasonal alteration between the capital and his birth home in the Carpathian mountains.

Andriy Bondar describes Lysheha as the Ukrainian Henry Thoreau of the beginning of the 21st century:

The way of life of ordinary people does not seem to apply to him. He exists in a parallel universe – he likes to walk barefoot in the city, to swim in the ice-cold river in winter, he catches fish with his teeth, knows how to make paper from mushrooms, never uses public transport, and does not have a job.

== Poems and translations ==
At the age of forty, Lysheha published his first collection of poems - "Great Bridge" (1989), a book which placed him at the forefront of the Ukrainian poetic community. Years later, after meeting his future co-translator James Brasfield, Lysheha published "The Selected Poems of Oleh Lysheha" (1999) making his work available for the first time to the English reader. A masterpiece of Ukrainian drama is Oleh Lysheha's miracle play "Friend Li Po, Brother Tu Fu" included in the second section of the 1999 English publication. Thirteen years after his first work, Lysheha published "To Snow and Fire" (2002).

Lysheha has also worked in the translation field. He has translated into the Ukrainian language works by T. S. Eliot and Ezra Pound. Lysheha is also the co-author of a book of translations from Chinese, The Stories of Ancient Chin.

=== The Selected Poems of Oleh Lysheha (1999) ===
Literary reviewers have written that The Selected Poems of Oleh Lysheha – the English translations of Lysheha – have nothing in common with the Ukrainian poetic tradition. As Bondar, for example, notes the poetry is "influenced by natural philosophy, shamanistic meditation, total denial of a technocratic world, and escapism." Lyshaha's publisher Harvard University Press describes the poet's work as "informed by transcendentalism and Zen-like introspection, with meditations on the essence of the human experience and man's place in nature."

Lysheha and Brasfield received the 2000 PEN Award for Poetry in Translation. A presentation of the award was held May 15 at the Walter Reade Theater at Lincoln Center for the Performing Arts in New York City. The poems were selected by Lysheha himself and follow the trajectory of his career. The book is divided into three parts. Section one holds shorter poems. Section two "is a witty, brief, three-act play mostly in prose, Friend Li Po, Brother Tu Fu." The third section consists of longer and more discursive narrative poems.

== Yara Arts Group ==
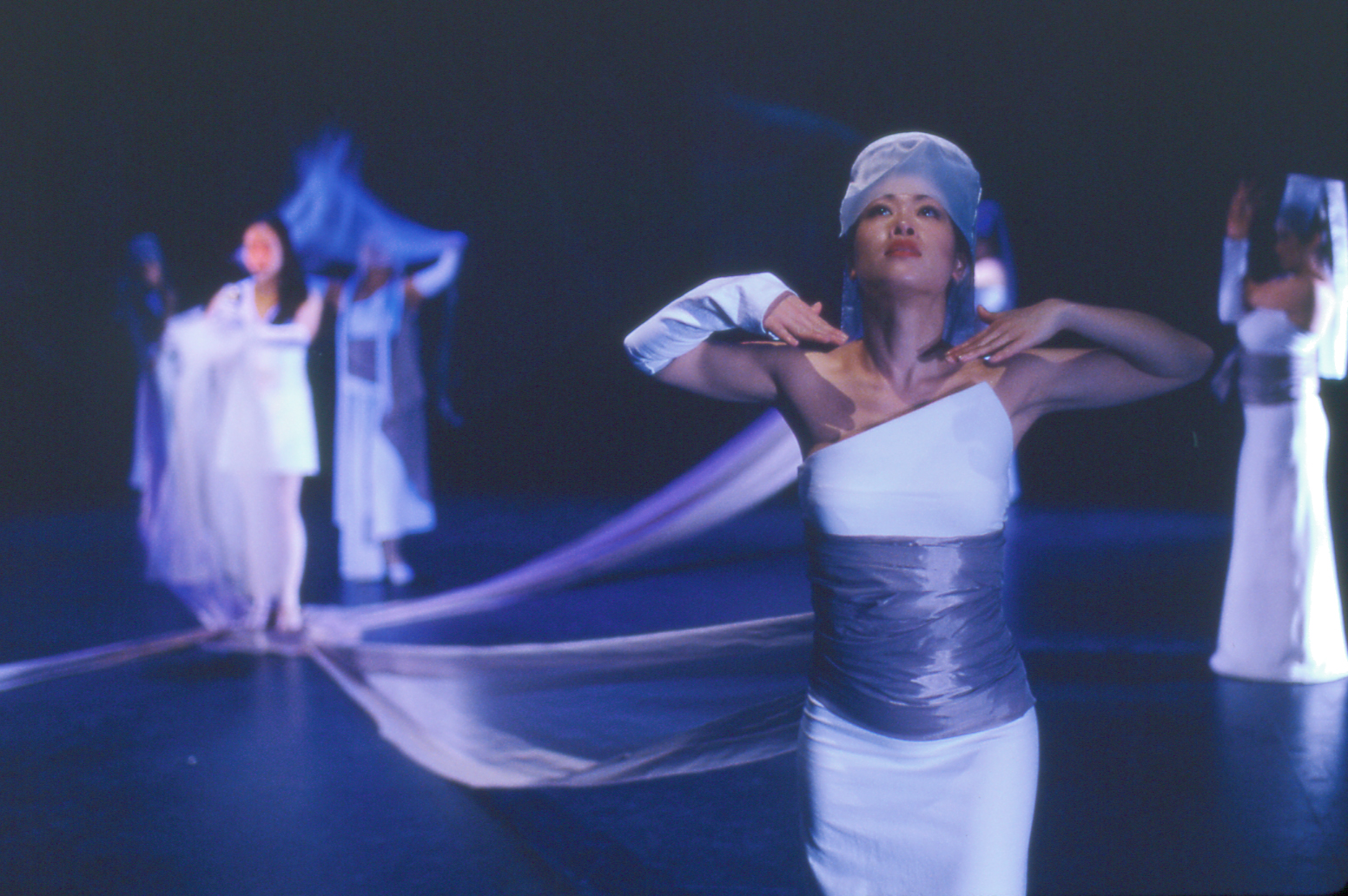
Yara Arts Group's "Circle" (1999)

Virlana Tkacz and Wanda Phipps started translating Oleh Lysheha’s work in 1991 when Yara Arts Group performed bilingual versions of his poems Song 212 and Song 2 at the Ukrainian Institute of America in New York. That summer Virlana staged Lysheha’s prose poem Mountain at Yara’s Theatre Workshop at Harvard . For several years in Harvard’s summer workshops she staged fragments from Lysheha’s play “Friend Li Po, Brother Tu Fu,” his poems Swan, Bear and De Luminis from Adamo et Diana. In 1998 Yara presented A Celebration of the Poetry of Oleh Lysheha.

In 2003 Virlana Tkacz staged Swan as a full production at La MaMa Experimental Theatre in New York with Yara artists Andrew Colteaux and Soomi Kim. Music was by Paul Brantley, design by Watoku Ueno and video by Andrea Odezynska. The critic for the Village Voice wrote: "Andrew Colteaux's vibrant performance as the poem's voice integrated speaking and movement, charting a landscape of loneliness, yearning, and ultimate surrender."

Yara’s production of Swan, performed at Harvard afterwards, received praise from critic Dzvinka Matiash, who wrote in Kyiv’s Komentar: "The production of Swan is a virtuoso translation of Lysheha’s text – it is not simply a literary translation into English, but rather a translation of poetry into the languages of music, light, image, movement of the human body, human voice…. This is what art should be like – in the glare of the stage lights you suddenly see the essence. But you can only catch a glimpse of it, just as you can only glimpse the swan in this show."

In 2011 Yara staged Lysheha's poem Raven, which was nominated for a New York Innovative Theatre award for design. Amy Lee Pearsall wrote in Nytheatre.com: "Raven incites this ensemble to glorious flight….The path flown by Raven is, by turns, intoxicating in both its simplicity and complexity. I encourage you to follow where it leads. Kinoteatr’s Roksoliana Sviato wrote: "Perhaps the most amazing thing about bis the magical and masterful way the poetry has been transformed into stage reality. If I had to provide examples of the most organic translations from one form of art into another, Virlana Tkacz’s theatrical 're-readings' of modern poetry would certainly be on that list." In 2013, Yara created Dream Bridge, which incorporated Lysheha’s earliest poems, and performed it in Kyrgyzstan, Kyiv and at La MaMa Experimental Theatre in New York.

Tkacz and Phipps translations of Lysheha work have been published in the journals Index on Censorship, Visions International, in the anthologies One Hundred Years of Youth and In a Different Light, and on the Poetry International websites.
