= Marilyn Hacker =

American poet, translator and critic (born 1942)

- Born: November 27, 1942 (age 83); Bronx, New York, U.S.
- Education: New York University (B.A.)
- Occupations: Poet, translator, critic
- Awards: Willis Barnstone Translation Prize; PEN Award for Poetry in Translation; PEN/Voelcker Award for Poetry

Marilyn Hacker (born November 27, 1942) is an American poet, translator and critic. She is Professor of English emerita at the City College of New York.

Her books of poetry include Presentation Piece (1974), which won the National Book Award, Love, Death, and the Changing of the Seasons (1986), and Going Back to the River (1990). In 2003, Hacker won the Willis Barnstone Translation Prize. In 2009, she subsequently won the PEN Award for Poetry in Translation for King of a Hundred Horsemen by Marie Étienne, which also garnered the first Robert Fagles Translation Prize from the National Poetry Series. In 2010, Hacker received the PEN/Voelcker Award for Poetry. She was shortlisted for the 2013 PEN Award for Poetry in Translation for her translation of Tales of a Severed Head by Rachida Madani.

== Early life and education ==
Hacker was born and raised in Bronx, New York, the only child of Jewish immigrant parents. Her father was a management consultant and her mother a teacher. Hacker attended the Bronx High School of Science, where she met her future husband Samuel R. Delany, who would become a well-known science-fiction writer. At the age of 15, she enrolled at New York University (B.A., 1964). Three years later, Hacker and Delany traveled from New York to Detroit and were married. In The Motion of Light in Water, Delany said they married in Detroit because of age-of-consent laws and because he was African-American and she was Caucasian: "there were only two states in the union where we could legally wed. The closest one was Michigan." They settled in New York's East Village. Their daughter, Iva Hacker-Delany, was born in 1974. Hacker and Delany, after being separated for many years, were divorced in 1980, but remain friends. Hacker is a lesbian, and Delany is a gay man.

In the 1960s and 1970s, Hacker worked mostly in commercial editing. She graduated with a bachelor of arts degree in Romance Languages in 1964.

== Career ==
Hacker's first publication was in Cornell University's Epoch. After moving to London in 1970, she found an audience through the pages of The London Magazine and Ambit. She and her husband edited the magazine Quark: A Quarterly of Speculative Fiction (4 issues; 1970–71). Early recognition came for her when Richard Howard, then editor of the New American Review, accepted three of Hacker's poems for publication.

In 1974, when she was 31 years old, Presentation Piece was published by The Viking Press. The book was a Lamont Poetry Selection of the Academy of American Poets and won the annual National Book Award for Poetry. Winter Numbers, which details the loss of many of her friends to AIDS and her own struggle with breast cancer, garnered a Lambda Literary Award and The Nation's Lenore Marshall Poetry Prize. Hacker's Selected Poems 1965-1990 received the 1996 Poets' Prize, and Squares and Courtyards won the 2001 Audre Lorde Award. She received an Award in Literature from the American Academy of Arts and Letters in 2004.

Hacker often employs strict poetic forms in her poetry: for example, in Love, Death, and the Changing of the Seasons, which is a verse novel in sonnets. She is also recognized as a master of "French forms" such as the rondeau and villanelle.

In 1990, she became the first full-time editor of The Kenyon Review, a position she held until 1994. She was noted for "broaden[ing] the quarterly's scope to include more minority and marginalized viewpoints." In a 2005 essay discussing the theme of food and drink in Hacker's poetry, scholar Mary Biggs describes her work as frequently referring to three "interlinked, paradoxical themes: (1) love and sex; (2) travel, exile, diaspora-counterpoised with family, community, home; and (3) the eternal and, for her, eternally positive association of women with nurturance and with homemaking in the broadest sense."

Hacker served as a Chancellor of the Academy of American Poets from 2008 to 2014.

Hacker lives in New York and Paris and has retired from teaching at the City College of New York and the CUNY Graduate Center.

Though not a character, a poem of Hacker's is reprinted in Heavenly Breakfast, Delany's memoir of a Greenwich Village commune in 1967; in Delany's autobiography, The Motion of Light in Water; and her prose and incidents about her appear in his journals, The Journals of Samuel R. Delany: In Search of Silence, Volume 1, 1957–1969, edited by Kenneth R. James (Wesleyan University Press, 2017).

Hacker was a judge for the 2012 Hippocrates Prize for Poetry and Medicine. In 2013, she was inducted into the New York Writers Hall of Fame. In 2014, she published a collaboration with a Palestinian-American poet, Deema Shehabi, written in the style of a Japanese renga, a form of alternating call and answer. The book, Diaspo/renga: a collaboration in alternating renga explores the emotional journey of living in exile.

In a review of the 2015 collection A Stranger's Mirror, Carol Muske-Dukes comments that Hacker has not received her "due as one of the most extraordinary innovative poets writing today." In a laudatory review of Hacker's 2019 collection Blazons, A. M. Juster states that "there is no poet writing in English with a better claim for the Nobel Prize in Literature than Marilyn Hacker."

== Bibliography ==
=== Poetry ===
- Presentation Piece (1974). ISBN 0-670-57399-X —winner of the National Book Award
- Separations (1976). ISBN 0-394-40070-4
- Taking Notice (1980). ISBN 0-394-51223-5
- Assumptions (1985). ISBN 0-394-72826-2
- Love, Death, and the Changing of the Seasons (1986). ISBN 978-0-393-31225-6
- Going Back to the River (1990). ISBN 0-394-58271-3
- The Hang-Glider's Daughter: New and Selected Poems (1991). ISBN 0-906500-36-2
- Selected Poems: 1965 - 1990 (1994). ISBN 978-0-393-31349-9
- Winter Numbers: Poems (1995). ISBN 978-0-393-31373-4
- Squares and Courtyards (2000). ISBN 978-0-393-32095-4
- Desesperanto: Poems 1999-2002 (2003). ISBN 978-0-393-32630-7
- First Cities: Collected Early Poems 1960-1979 (2003). ISBN 978-0-393-32432-7
- Essays on Departure: New and Selected Poems (2006). ISBN 1-903039-78-9
- Names: Poems (2009). ISBN 978-0-393-33967-3
- A Stranger's Mirror: New and Selected Poems 1994 – 2014 (2015). ISBN 978-0-393-24464-9
- Blazons: New and Selected Poems, 2000 – 2018 (2019), Carcanet Press. ISBN 978-1-784-10715-4
- Calligraphies: Poems (2023), W. W. Norton & Company. ISBN 9781324036463

=== Translations ===
- Étienne, Marie (2009). King of a Hundred Horsemen: Poems. Translator Marilyn Hacker. Farrar Straus Giroux. ISBN 978-0-374-53192-8.
- de Dadelsen, Jean-Paul (2020). That Light, All at Once, Translator, Marilyn Hacker, Yale University Press.
- Goffette, Guy (2007). Charlestown Blues: Selected Poems, A Bilingual Edition, Translator, Marilyn Hacker, The University of Chicago Press. ISBN 9780226300740
- Malroux, Claire (2005). Birds and Bison, Translator, Marilyn Hacker, Syracuse University Press. ISBN 1-931357-25-0
- Malroux, Claire (2020). Daybreak (2020), Translator, Marilyn Hacker, New York Review Books. ISBN 9781681375021
- Khoury-Ghata, Vénus (2003). She Says, Translator, Marilyn Hacker, Graywolf Press. ISBN 978-1-55597-383-4
- Khoury-Ghata, Vénus (2022). The Water People, Translator, Marilyn Hacker, The Poetry Translation Centre, U.K.
- Madani, Rachida (2012), Tales of a Severed Head. Translator, Marilyn Hacker. New Haven: Yale University Press.
- Negrouche, Samira (2020). The Olive Trees' Jazz and Other Poems. Translator Marilyn Hacker. Pleiades Press.

=== Anthologies ===
- (edited with Samuel R. Delany) Quark/1 (1970, science fiction)
- (edited with Samuel R. Delany) Quark/2 (1971, science fiction)
- (edited with Samuel R. Delany) Quark/3 (1971, science fiction)
- (edited with Samuel R. Delany) Quark/4 (1971, science fiction)

=== Literary criticism ===
- Hacker, Marilyn. Unauthorized Voices (Poets on Poetry Series, University of Michigan Press, 2010)
