= Jen Hofer =

American poet (born 1971)

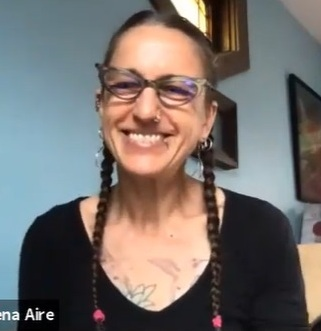
- Hofer in 2020
- Born: 1971 (age 54–55); San Francisco, California, U.S.
- Occupations: American poet and translator
- Organization: Antena-Aire
- Awards: PEN Award for Poetry in Translation; Harold Morton Landon Translation Award
- Website: https://antenaantena.org/about-us-2/

Jen Hofer (born 1971) is an American poet, translator, and interpreter.

== Biography ==
Jen Hofer was born in San Francisco, and lives in Los Angeles.

Hofer is an American poet and translator, and is currently an adjunct professor of MFA writing at Otis College of Art and Design. Prior to that, Hofer was as an Adjunct Professor at California Institute of the Arts.

Hofer was the co-founder (with JD Pluecker) of Antena Aire (formerly called Antena), a "language justice and language experimentation collaborative".

== Awards ==
Hofer won the 2012 PEN Award for Poetry in Translation, for the poem Negro Marfil/Ivory Black. The PEN Award judges refer to Hofer's translation of Negro Marfil/Ivory Black as a work that "articulates writing as a gesture hovering between binaries, bodies, languages, modes of perception, cultures...[and is] reflexively about translation.

Hofer also won the Harold Morton Landon Translation Award in 2012 for the translation of Myriam Moscona's book Negro Marfil/Ivory Black.

== Works ==
=== Poetry ===
- As far as, A+Bend Press, 1999
- Slide rule, Subpress, 2002, ISBN 9781930068155
- Lawless, Seeing Eye Books, 2003
- Laws, Dusie Kollektiv, 2007
- Going Going, Dusie Kollektiv, 2007
- 13 things I would photograph for you if I could, Self-published, 2009
- One, Palm Press, 2009, ISBN 9780978926298
- Trouble : August 2009, 3:15 a.m., Dusie Kollektiv, 2010
- Lead & Tether, California Institute of the Arts, 2011
- The Missing Link, Insert Blanc Press, 2014

=== Translations ===
- Sin puertas visibles: An Anthology of Contemporary Poetry by Mexican Women, University of Pittsburgh Press, 2003, ISBN 9780822957980
- Laura Solórzano, Lip Wolf, Action Books, 2007, ISBN 9780976569275
- Dolores Dorantes, sexoPUROsexoVELOZ and Septiembre, Books 2 and 3 of Dolores Dorantes, Counterpath Press and Kenning Editions, 2008, ISBN 9780976736424
- Myriam Moscona, Ivory Black, Les Figues Press, 2011, ISBN 9781934254226

=== Group projects and Collaborations ===
- Bernadette Mayer, Lee Ann Brown, Jen Hofer, Danika Dinsmore, The 3:15 Experiment, Owl Press, 2001 ISBN 9780966943030
- Patrick F. Durgin, Jen Hofer, The Route, Atelos, 2008, ISBN 9781891190308
