= Laurie Greenan =

American costume designer (born 1947)

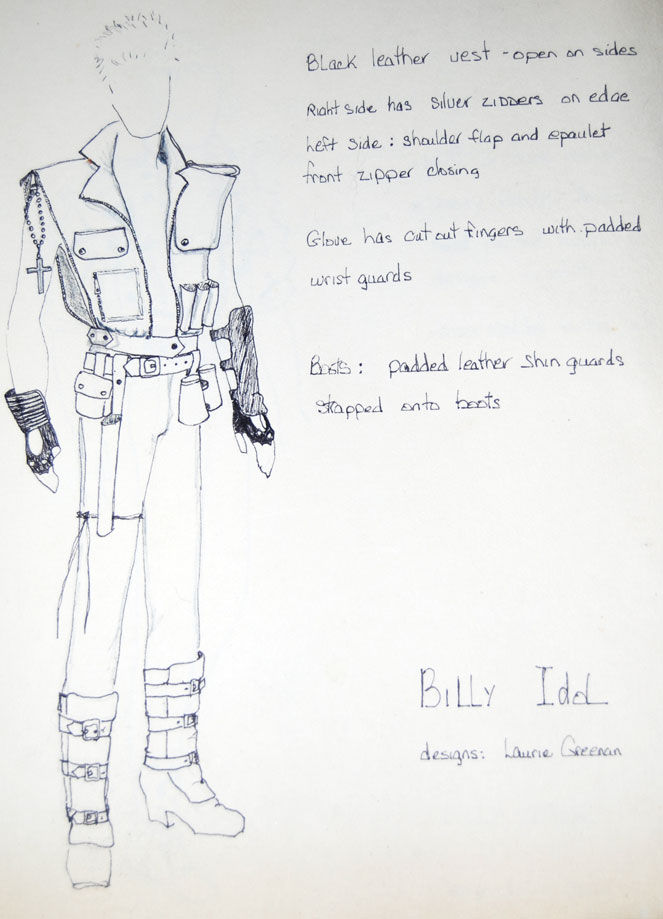
Photograph of stage costume design by Laurie Greenan for Billy Idol

Laurie Greenan (born Kiloran Greenan; November 20, 1947, in New York City), worked as a wardrobe supervisor, costume maker and designer from 1976 to the late 1980s creating stage clothing for a series of rock musicians. She was described as "a Gloria Vanderbilt of heavy metal haute couture" or more simply "Queen of Heavy Metal" as a sought-after professional with a track record in dressing male performers. Greenan established her reputation as a designer over a seven-year period working as wardrobe manager for the rock band Kiss. She subsequently designed costumes for other rock acts specializing but not exclusively working with heavy metal bands. Artists who commissioned designs include Judas Priest, Manowar, Todd Rundgren, Tom Waits and Billy Squier. She worked closely with individuals such as Billy Idol, and Rob Halford to devise costumes that recharged their stage image.

== Biography ==
Born in New York City, Greenan's early childhood was spent traveling across the United States with her father, a journeyman printer, and her mother, a secretary who was a highly skilled seamstress. Throughout these years Greenan developed her sewing skills, making her own clothes from the age of 12.

The family returned to New York City, where Greenan completed high school. She began her career the summer of her graduation in summer stock theater where she worked for the next few years. This included a season with the Trinity Square Repertory Company in Providence, Rhode Island working as their sole wardrobe mistress. At 18 she was, according to the artistic director, the youngest wardrobe mistress working in a government funded repertory company in the U.S. Her formal education continued at Hunter College as an art major followed by courses at the Traphagen School of Fashion for pattern making and grading. Becoming costume historian at the Brooks-Van Horn Costume Company in New York City led to work as a wardrobe stylist and prop buyer for commercial photographers and filmmakers. It was through the pornographic film industry with its more casual employment practices that Greenan secured membership to the trade union IATSE - International Alliance of Theatrical Stage Employees. This enabled her to progress into working as a commercial photographer's stylist on advertising campaigns for major corporations such as Eastman Kodak, Seagram and General Mills. By 1973 she was freelancing as an art director working on brands including Tide, Purina, Clorets, Lipton. She worked on various high-profile projects celebrating the United States Bicentennial including the Bicentennial issue of Time Magazine.

Her first work in film was as a researcher and associate art director for "American Years" (1976, 48min) directed by Francis Thompson and Jan Kadar for the City of Philadelphia celebrating the US Bicentennial. At 48 minutes long, this was one of the earliest features produced in the IMAX 70mm format.

== Kiss ==
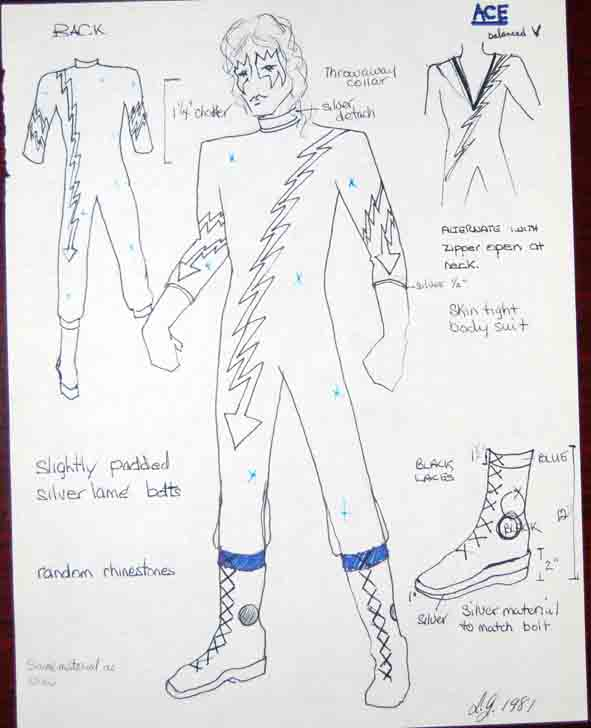
Photograph of design work by Laurie Greenan for stage costume for Ace Frehley of the rock band KISS worn 1981-1982

Greenan's career in the rock music business began in 1976 when she was hired by the rock band Kiss following an interview with manager Bill Aucoin and Kiss bassist Gene Simmons. Initially employed to manage the stage costumes from her base in New York while the band toured, she was soon recruited to join the tour itself becoming the only female production member or road crew to travel with the group. From wardrobe maintenance her role developed to coordinating make-up and contributing design work, in addition to tailoring the band members' wardrobe such as brocade jackets and velvet patchwork jeans. Her design work for the stage extended the band's leather-clad look credited to Larry LeGaspi as the first designer to work with Kiss until 1978.

Her costume work first appears on the Kiss Alive II album cover in 1977, and subsequently featured throughout the Alive II tour of Japan in 1978. Her first costume designs for the band appeared on the cover of the Love Gun album in 1977. Greenan also produced the costumes worn by the band and their stuntmen for the NBC film "Kiss Meets the Phantom of the Park" (also known as Kiss in the Attack of the Phantoms). The popular Kiss action figures that were marketed at this time featured the costumes worn on tour between 1977 and 1978. As a member of the crew, Greenan's original work went uncredited, and the obstacle this presented to claiming royalties on the merchandise sales led to Greenan's departure from Kiss in 1983.

== Freelance ==
Greenan's freelance work in the rock music industry moved from stage production and tours to costume design, with a break from design in the summer of 1980 when she acted as personal assistant and dresser to Diana Ross. From 1984 she pursued her interest in traditional American needlecraft establishing a business in Florida, Kiloran American Design, now KiloranDesigns.

Despite her relocation to the town of Mount Dora, Florida various internationally known musicians sought her out to explore new looks and create costumes that promoted their developing stage personas. This work varied between designing for groups as a whole or focusing on the individual. Examples of working with groups include designs influenced by traditional Middle eastern costume produced for Todd Rundgren and the group Utopia during their 'Egyptian' phase following the recording of the album Ra. Another are the designs produced for the group Manowar, inspired by the comic book and film character, Conan the Barbarian.

Greenan worked with Billy Idol to introduce a "Road Warrior" look to his stage persona inspired by the 1981 film Mad Max 2. Working closely with the artist she adapted elements from the designs of Norma Moriceau whose hybrid costumes in the film influenced rock performances and street fashion throughout the early 1980s. Her brief from Rob Halford of Judas Priest was to make him appear more aggressive within the established Heavy Metal look of the group, and her research included being flown to Paris to watch the band perform. She introduced widened shoulders and a sharper line to Halford's costume, retaining the use of real leather loaded with extensive metal studwork.

== The costumes ==
I spent a lot of time studying S&M clothing, because it uses so much metal, silver and studs. I just tried to tone it down by removing some of the sexual aspects. S&M was heavy metal long before heavy metal was.

Greenan's work demanded that she create garments that could withstand the physical demands of live performance, create a strong visual impact from a distance, as well as retain a detailed finish equal to the scrutiny of photographic close-ups.

You can't approach this stuff like stage costumes, where you can substitute, say, corduroy for velvet. Those guys stand up close, or they're being photographed, or they're running through a crowd to get to the stage. It can't look fake. No short cuts.

Greenan used a small clothing manufacturer whose partner was a master leather worker. She would source materials, supervise the fittings and arrange bill payments. The costs of redesigning a band's look from sketch to concert stage would range between $15,000 to $20,000 in the early 1980s. Greenan insisted on the use of real leather and hand stitched studs. A single outfit could weigh up to 30 lbs. The cost of dressing members of rock groups in this Heavy Metal fashion was estimated by Greenan in an interview of 1985 at between $3,000 and $5,000. Customized boots reached $1,000 a pair. The demands of a tour schedule which included laundering, photo sessions and theft meant that two of everything needed to be produced and maintained.

Greenan's work was better known behind the scenes than by the fans of the bands she worked with. As is the case with most production staff in the music industry at the time her name appears in thank you lists on album sleeves. The moniker of "Queen of Heavy Metal" is attributed to Judas Priest in recognition of her experience in the production of performance costumes that epitomized Heavy Metal fashion.
