= James Grennan =

Irish Gaelic footballer

James Grennan is an Irish former Gaelic footballer who played for the Offaly county team. He played in midfield.

Grennan attended St Joseph & St Saran's Secondary School in Ferbane. He won a Leinster Senior Football Championship (SFC) medal in 1997. Manager Tommy Lyons spoke of Grennan as a solution to his midfield problem. The following year, he won a National Football League medal. His 1999 season was affected by injury. Grennan played an important role in midfield during the 2000 Leinster SFC defeat of reigning All-Ireland champions Meath at Croke Park. Later the same year he dislocated his shoulder, also while playing for Offaly. He was sent off against Cork in the 2002 National Football League. His involvement in Offaly's 2002 Leinster SFC campaign was affected by injury. When the Games Administration Committee gave fellow Offaly player Roy Malone an eight-week ban following the 2002 Leinster SFC semi-final replay, Grennan was cited too but was not suspended. In late 2003, Grennan was not included in new Offaly manager Gerry Fahey's panel.
