= James Brasfield =

American poet and translator

James Brasfield (born January 19, 1952, in Savannah, Georgia) is an American poet and translator.

== Life ==
He graduated from Armstrong State College, and Columbia University, with an MFA.

His work has appeared in AGNI, Chicago Review, Colorado Review, Crazyhorse, The Iowa Review, New Orleans Review, Poetry Wales, The Seattle Review, and The Southern Review.

He was a Fulbright Scholar at the National University of Kyiv-Mohyla Academy, Ukraine from 1993 through 1994; he later returned to Ukraine to teach at the Chernivtsi Yuri Fedkovych State University in 1999. He taught at Western Carolina University and was visiting assistant professor in the University of Memphis in 2008 through 2009. Brasfield retired from the English Department at Pennsylvania State University as 2017 as professor emeritus.

Brasfield lives in Belfast, Maine.

== Awards ==
- 2001 NEA Fellowship in Poetry
- 2000 PEN Award for Poetry in Translation
- The American Association for Ukrainian Studies Prize for Translation, 1999
- The Pennsylvania Council on the Arts Fellowship

== Works ==
- "Celan", AGNI, 2002
- "Palladium" (2016), Originally published in Poem-a-Day on August 10, 2016, by the Academy of American Poets.
  - This poem was set to song, titled "Palladium", with permission from Brasfield by composer Edward Jacobs in 2017.
- Inheritance and Other Poems. Armstrong College Press. (Chapbook)
- Ledger of Crossroads. Louisiana State University Press. December 2009. ISBN 978-0-8071-3520-4.
- Infinite Altars. Louisiana State University Press. August 2016. ISBN 978-0807164242.
- Cove. Louisiana State University Press. January 11, 2023. ISBN 978-0807176603.

=== Translations ===
- "Swan", Oleh Lysheha, AGNI, 2002
- Oleh Lysheha (1999). The Selected Poems of Oleh Lysheha. Translator James Brasfield. Ukrainian Research Institute, Harvard University. ISBN 978-0-916458-90-4.

=== Anthologies ===
- Diane Boller; Don Selby; Chryss Yost, eds. (2003). Poetry Daily: 366 Poems from the World's Most Popular Poetry Website. Sourcebooks, Inc. ISBN 978-1-4022-0151-6.
- Feathers from the Angel’s Wing: Poems Inspired by the Paintings of Piero della Francesca (Persea Books, 2016), edited by Dana Prescott
