= List of poets from the United States =

The poets listed below were either born in the United States or else published much of their poetry while living in that country.

== A ==
- Henry Abbey (1842–1911)
- Arthur Talmage Abernethy (1872–1956)
- Sam Abrams (born 1935)
- Seth Abramson (born 1976)
- Diane Ackerman (born 1948)
- Duane Ackerson (1942–2020)
- Mercedes de Acosta (1893–1968)
- Virginia Hamilton Adair (1913–2004)
- Helen Adam (1909–1993)
- John Adams (1704–1740)
- Léonie Adams (1899–1988)
- Kim Addonizio (born 1954)
- James Agee (1909–1955)
- Deborah Ager (born 1971)
- Kelli Russell Agodon (born 1969)
- Julie Agoos (born 1956)
- Ai (1947–2010)
- Conrad Aiken (1889–1973)
- Ammiel Alcalay (born 1956)
- Amos Bronson Alcott (1799–1888)
- Louisa May Alcott (1832–1888)
- Sherman Alexie (born 1966)
- Felipe Alfau (1902–1999)
- Kazim Ali (born 1971)
- Dick Allen (1939–2017)
- Donald Allen (1912–2004)
- Elizabeth Akers Allen (1832–1911)
- Ron Allen (1947–2010)
- Washington Allston (1779–1843)
- Alta (Alta Gerrey) (1942–2024)
- Alurista (born 1947)
- Julia Álvarez (born 1950)
- Indran Amirthanayagam (born 1960)
- A.R. Ammons (1926–2001)
- Maggie Anderson (born 1948)
- Maria Frances Anderson (1819–1895)
- Victor Anderson (1917–2001)
- Bruce Andrews (born 1948)
- Kevin Andrews (1924–1989)
- Ron Androla (born 1954)
- Ralph Angel (1951–2020)
- Maya Angelou (1928–2014)
- David Antin (1932–2016)
- Antler (born 1946)
- Susanne Antonetta (born 1956)
- Philip Appleman (1926–2020)
- Rae Armantrout (born 1947)
- Richard Armour (1906–1989)
- Craig Arnold (1967–2009)
- Rebecca Aronson
- Elizabeth Barr Arthur (1884–1971)
- John Ashbery (1927–2017)
- Joseph Auslander (1897–1965)
- Paul Auster (born 1947)
- James Avery (1945–2013)
- Jody Azzouni (born 1954)

== B ==
=== Ba–Bm ===
- Jimmy Santiago Baca (born 1952)
- Bellamy Bach (pseudonym used by a group of writers)
- Joseph M. Bachelor (1889–1947)
- Margaret Lucy Shands Bailey (1812–1888)
- Vyt Bakaitis (born 1940)
- David Baker (born 1954)
- Julia K. Wetherill Baker (1858–1931)
- John Balaban (born 1943)
- Jesse Ball (born 1978)
- Mary Canfield Ballard (1852–1927)
- Addie L. Ballou (1837–1916)
- Charles Bane Jr. (born 1951)
- Russell Banks (born 1940)
- Melissa Elizabeth Riddle Banta (1834–1907)
- Amiri Baraka (born Everett Leroy Jones, 1934–2014), also known as LeRoi Jones and Imamu Amear Baraka
- Coleman Barks (1937–2026)
- Joel Barlow (1754–1812)
- Mary Barnard (1909–2001)
- Djuna Barnes (1892–1982)
- Jim Barnes (born 1933)
- Annie Wall Barnett (1859–1942)
- Catherine Barnett (born 1960)
- Laird Barron (born 1970)
- Bertha Hirsch Baruch
- Todd Bash (born 1965)
- Ellen Bass (born 1947)
- Arlo Bates (1850–1918)
- David Bates (1809–1870)
- Harriet Bates (1856–1886), wrote under the name Eleanor Putnam
- Joseph Bathanti (born 1953)
- Dawn-Michelle Baude (born 1959)
- Isaac Rieman Baxley (1850–1920)
- Charles Baxter (born 1947)
- Abel Beach (1829–1899)
- Ray Young Bear (born 1950)
- Anthony Bearden (1913–1966)
- Paul Beatty (born 1962)
- Kenneth Lawrence Beaudoin (c. 1913 – 1995)
- George Beck (1749–1812)
- Julian Beck (1925–1985)
- Larry Beckett (born 1947)
- Joshua Beckman (born 1971)
- Lou Singletary Bedford (1837 – unknown)
- Ethel Lynn Beers (1827–1879)
- Erin Belieu (born 1967)
- Marvin Bell (1937–2020)
- Hester A. Benedict (1838–1921)
- Stephen Vincent Benét (1898–1943)
- William Rose Benét (1886–1950)
- Park Benjamin Sr. (1809–1864)
- John Bensko
- Nelson Bentley (1918–1990)
- Bill Berkson (1939–2016)
- David Berman (1967–2019)
- Charles Bernstein (born 1950)
- Steven Jesse Bernstein (1950–1991)
- Anselm Berrigan (born 1972)
- Ted Berrigan (1934–1983)
- Wendell Berry (born 1934)
- John Berryman (1914–1972)
- Mei-mei Berssenbrugge (born 1947)
- Eva Best (1851–1925)
- Lorraine Bethel
- Helen Bevington (1906–2001)
- Frank Bidart (born 1939)
- Ambrose Bierce (1842–c. 1913)
- Linda Bierds (born 1945)
- David Biespiel (born 1964)
- Helen Louisa Bostwick Bird (1826–1907)
- Elizabeth Bishop (1911–1979)
- John Peale Bishop (1892–1944)
- Morris Bishop (1893–1973)
- Sherwin Bitsui (born 1975)
- Baxter Black (1945–2022)
- Sophie Cabot Black (born 1958)
- Paul Blackburn (1926–1971)
- Nicole Blackman (born 1971)
- Kimberly M. Blaeser (born 1955)
- Brian Blanchfield (born 1973)
- Don Blanding (1894–1957)
- Robin Blaser (1925–2009)
- Anthony Bleecker (1770–1827)
- Adrian Blevins (born 1964)
- Benjamin Paul Blood (1832–1919)
- Henry Ames Blood (1836–1900)
- Roberts Blossom (1924–2011)
- Annie R. Blount (1839 – unknown), various pen names, including Jennie Woodbine
- Robert Bly (born (1926–2021)

=== Bn–Bz ===
- Maxwell Bodenheim (1892–1954)
- Louise Bogan (1897–1970)
- Sarah T. Bolton (1814–1893)
- Arna Bontemps (1902–1973)
- Michelle Boisseau (1955–2017)
- Laure-Anne Bosselaar
- Bruce Boston (born 1943)
- David Bottoms (born 1949)
- Jenny Boully (born 1976)
- Geoff Bouvier (born 1969)
- Cathy Smith Bowers (born 1949)
- Edgar Bowers (1924–2000)
- Kay Boyle (1902–1992)
- Virginia Frazer Boyle (1863–1938)
- William Brandon (1914–2002)
- Anne Bradstreet (c. 1612 – 1672)
- Mae Bramhall (c. 1861 – 1897)
- Adelia Pope Branham (1861–1917)
- Beth Brant (born 1941)
- Giannina Braschi (born 1953)
- Richard Brautigan (1935–1984)
- Kate Braverman (1950–2019)
- Donari Braxton (born 1982)
- Joseph Payne Brennan (1918–1990)
- Ken Brewer (1941–2006)
- Martha Wadsworth Brewster (1710 – c. 1757)
- Kim Bridgford (born 1959)
- Besmilr Brigham (1913–2000)
- John Malcolm Brinnin (1916–1999)
- Eve Brodlique (1867–1949)
- Joseph Brodsky (1940–1996)
- Louis Daniel Brodsky (1941–2014)
- David Bromige (1933–2009)
- William Bronk (1918–1999)
- Charles Timothy Brooks (1813–1883)
- Gwendolyn Brooks (1917–2000)
- Maria Gowen Brooks (c. 1795 – 1845)
- Alice Williams Brotherton (1848–1930)
- Olga Broumas (born 1949)
- Alice Brown (1856–1948)
- Harry Brown (1917–1986)
- Rita Mae Brown (born 1944)
- Emma Alice Browne (1835–1890)
- Francis Fisher Browne (1843–1913)
- William Cullen Bryant (1794–1878)
- Jack Buck (1924–2002)
- David Budbill (born 1940)
- Charles Bukowski (1920–1994)
- Gelett Burgess (1866–1951)
- Julia de Burgos (1914–1953)
- Eudora Stone Bumstead (1860–1892)
- David R. Bunch (1925–2000)
- Henry Cuyler Bunner (1855–1896)
- José Antonio Burciaga (1940–1996)
- Gelett Burgess (1866–1951)
- Stanley Burnshaw (1906–2005)
- Amelia Josephine Burr (1878–1968)
- Maxwell Struthers Burt (1882–1954)
- Raegan Butcher (born 1969)
- Ellis Parker Butler (1869–1937)
- Ray Buttigieg (born 1955)
- W. E. Butts (1944–2013)
- Kathryn Stripling Byer (1944–2017)
- Witter Bynner (1881–1968)
- Gilbert Byron (1903–1991)

== C ==
- Alex Caldiero (born 1949)
- James Edwin Campbell (1867–1896)
- Mary Baine Campbell
- Melville Henry Cane (1879–1980)
- Francesca Anna Canfield (1803–1833)
- Skipwith Cannell (1887–1957)
- Joe Cardarelli (1944–1994)
- Will Carleton (1845–1912)
- Carrie Carlton (1834–1868)
- Thomas John Carlisle (1913–1992)
- Jim Carroll (1949–2009)
- Hayden Carruth (1921–2008)
- Guy Wetmore Carryl (1873–1904)
- Jared Carter (born 1939)
- Willa Cather (1873–1947)
- Raymond Carver (1938–1988)
- Phoebe Cary (1824–1871)
- Marietta Stanley Case (1845–1900)
- Cyrus Cassells (born 1957)
- Ana Castillo (born 1953)
- Sandra M. Castillo
- Madison Cawein (1865–1914)
- Thomas Centolella
- Joseph Ceravolo (1934–1988)
- Catherine Chandler (born 1950)
- Tina Chang (born 1969)
- William Ellery Channing (1818–1901)
- Arthur Chapman (1874–1935)
- John Jay Chapman (1862–1933)
- Fred Chappell (born 1936)
- Angélico Chávez (1910–1996)
- Alexander Chee (born 1967)
- Neeli Cherkovski (1945–2024)
- Maxine Chernoff (born 1952)
- Kelly Cherry (1940–2022)
- James Wm. Chichetto (born 1941)
- William Childress (1933–2022)
- Emelie C. S. Chilton (1838–1864)
- Khendum Choden
- Franny Choi (born 1989)
- Chrystos (born 1946)
- John Ciardi (1916–1986)
- Noah Cicero (born 1980)
- Sandra Cisneros (born 1954)
- Carson Cistulli (born 1979)
- Amy Clampitt (1920–1994)
- Tom Clark (born 1941–2018)
- Walter Van Tilburg Clark (1909–1971)
- John Lee Clark (born 1978)
- John Clarke (1933–1992)
- Lucille Clifton (1936–2010)
- Joshua Clover (born 1962)
- Florence Earle Coates (1850–1927)
- Grace Stone Coates (1881–1976)
- Stanton A. Coblentz (1896–1982)
- Andrei Codrescu (born 1946)
- Robert P. T. Coffin (1892–1955)
- Ira Cohen (1935–2011)
- Nan Cohen (born 1968)
- Jim Cohn (born 1953)
- Henri Cole (born 1956)
- Norma Cole (born 1945)
- Wanda Coleman (1946–2014)
- Billy Collins (born 1941)
- Martha Collins (born 1940)
- Cathy Colman
- Betsy Colquitt (1927–2009)
- Shanna Compton (born 1970)
- Hilda Conkling (1910–1986)
- Evan S. Connell (1924–2013)
- Leo Connellan (1928–2001)
- Gillian Conoley (born 1955)
- Victor Contoski (born 1936)
- J. Gordon Coogler (1865–1901)
- Rose Terry Cooke (1827–1892)
- Ina Coolbrith (1841–1928)
- Clark Coolidge (born 1939)
- Dennis Cooper (born 1953)
- Jake Copass (1920–2006)
- William Corbett (1942–2018)
- Billy Corgan (born 1967)
- Cid Corman (1924–2004)
- Alfred Corn (born 1943)
- Gregory Corso (1930–2001)
- Jayne Cortez (1934–2012)
- Gerald Costanzo
- Joe Cottonwood (born 1947)
- Henri Coulette (1927–1988)
- John Cournos (1881–1966)
- Elise Cowen (1933–1962)
- Louis O. Coxe (1918–1993)
- Christopher Pearse Cranch (1813–1892)
- Hart Crane (1899–1932)
- Stephen Crane (1871–1900)
- Adelaide Crapsey (1878–1914)
- Alice Arnold Crawford (1850–1874)
- Gary William Crawford (born 1953)
- Robert Creeley (1926–2005)
- Judson Crews (1917–2010)
- Harry Crosby (1898–1929)
- Anne Virginia Culbertson (1857–1918)
- Countee Cullen (1903–1946)
- E. E. Cummings (1894–1962)
- James Cummins
- J.V. Cunningham (1911–1985)
- John Curl (born 1940)
- Jen Currin
- Bloodgood Cutter (1817–1906)

== D ==
- Beverly Dahlen (born 1934)
- Steve Dalachinsky (1946–2019)
- Enid Dame (1943–2003)
- S. Foster Damon (1893–1971)
- Jim Daniels (born 1956)
- Elizabeth Otis Dannelly (1838–1896)
- Hugh Antoine d'Arcy (1842–1925)
- Annie McCarer Darlington (1836–1907)
- Tina Darragh (born 1950)
- Robert Dassanowsky (born 1960)
- Guy Davenport (1927–2005)
- Chad Davidson (born 1970)
- Donald Davidson (1893–1968)
- Gustav Davidson (1895–1971)
- Lucretia Maria Davidson (1808–1825)
- Michael Davidson (born 1944)
- Alan Davies (born 1951)
- Dale Davis
- Gwen Davis (born 1936)
- Jon Davis (born 1952)
- Clarence Day (1874–1935)
- Jaime de Angulo (1887–1950)
- Violet Kazue de Cristoforo (1917–2007)
- Caridad de la Luz (born 1977)
- Philip F. Deaver (born 1946)
- Madeline DeFrees (1919–2015)
- Alice S. Deletombe (1854–1929)
- Edwin Denby (1903–1983)
- Richard Denner (born 1941)
- Reuel Denney (1913–1995)
- Carl Dennis (born 1939)
- Tory Dent (1958–2005)
- Babette Deutsch (1895–1982)
- Jamie DeWolf (born 1977 as Jamie Kennedy)
- Diane Di Prima (1934–2020)
- Jennifer K Dick (born 1970)
- George Dickerson (1933–2015)
- James Dickey (1923–1997)
- Emily Dickinson (1830–1886)
- Roger Dickinson-Brown (born 1944)
- Matthew Dickman (born 1975)
- Michael Dickman (born 1975)
- Annie Dillard (born 1945)
- R. H. W. Dillard (1937–2023)
- George Dillon (1906–1968)
- Hiram Powers Dilworth (1878—1975)
- Ray DiPalma (1943–2016)
- Thomas M. Disch (1940–2008)
- Yana Djin (born 1969)
- Patricia Dobler (1939–2004)
- Stephen Dobyns (born 1941)
- Mary Ann Hanmer Dodd (1813–1878)
- Owen Dodson (1914–1983)
- John Dolan (born 1955)
- Nathan Haskell Dole (1852–1935)
- Phebe Cobb Larry Dole (1835-1909)
- Sonya Dorman (1924–2005)
- Ed Dorn (1929–1999)
- Julia Caroline Dorr (1825–1913)
- Catherine Doty
- Mark Doty (born 1953)
- Alice May Douglas (1865–1943)
- Marian Douglas (1842–1913)
- Franz Douskey (born 1941)
- Rita Dove (born 1952)
- Kirby Doyle (1932–2003)
- Joseph Rodman Drake (1795–1820)
- Will Allen Dromgoole (1860–1934)
- Celia Dropkin (1887–1956)
- Norman Dubie (born 1945)
- Bruce Ducker (born 1938)
- Peter Kane Dufault (1923–2013)
- Amanda Ruter Dufour (1822–1899)
- Alan Dugan (1923–2003)
- Denise Duhamel (born 1961)
- Michael Dumanis (born 1976)
- Henry Dumas (1934–1968)
- Paul Laurence Dunbar (1872–1906)
- Robert Duncan (1919–1988)
- Emma Bedelia Dunham (1826–1910)
- Stephen Dunn (1939–2021)
- Rachel Blau DuPlessis (born 1941)
- Job Durfee (1790–1847)
- Stuart Dybek (born 1942)
- Bob Dylan (born 1941)

== E ==
- Cornelius Eady (born 1954)
- Pliny Earle (1809–1892)
- Richard Eberhart (1904–2005)
- David Edelstadt (1866–1892)
- Russell Edson (1935–2014)
- Ivan Edwards
- kari edwards (1954–2006)
- Terry Ehret (born 1955)
- Max Ehrmann (1872–1945)
- Larry Eigner (1927–1996)
- Loren Eiseley (1907–1977)
- T. S. Eliot (1888–1965)
- Thomas Sayers Ellis (1963–2025)
- James Emanuel (1921–2013)
- Lynn Emanuel (born 1949)
- Claudia Emerson (born 1957)
- Ralph Waldo Emerson (1803–1882)
- Paul Engle (1908–1991)
- Theodore Enslin (1925–2011)
- Daniel Mark Epstein (born 1948)
- Elaine Equi (born 1953)
- Clayton Eshleman (1935–2021)
- Martín Espada (born 1957)
- Willard R. Espy (1910–1999)
- Maggie Estep (1963–2014)
- David Allan Evans (born 1940)
- Mari Evans (1923–2017)
- Landis Everson (1926–2007)
- William Everson, Brother Antoninus (1912–1994)
- Eve Ewing (born 1986)

== F ==
- Ruth Fainlight (born 1931)
- B. H. Fairchild (born 1942)
- Noah Falck (born 1977)
- William Clark Falkner (c. 1825–1889)
- Joel Fallon (1931–2016)
- Roger Fanning (born 1962)
- Norma Farber (1909–1984)
- Patricia Fargnoli (1937–2021)
- John C. Farrar (1896–1974)
- Jessie Redmon Fauset (1882–1961)
- Kenneth Fearing (1902–1961)
- Frederick Feirstein (born 1940)
- Irving Feldman (born 1928)
- Lawrence Ferlinghetti (1919–2021)
- Bessie Alexander Ficklen (1861–1945)
- Eugene Field (1850–1895)
- Rachel Field (1894–1942)
- James T. Fields (1817–1881)
- Annie Finch (born 1956)
- Mike Finley (1950–2020)
- Charles C. Finn (born 1941)
- Max Finstein (1924–1982)
- Ann Fisher-Wirth (born 1947)
- Anna M. Fitch (1840–1904)
- Ray Fitzgerald (born 20th century)
- Bob Flanagan (1952–1996)
- John Gould Fletcher (1886–1950)
- Roland Flint (1934–2001)
- Nick Flynn (born 1960)
- Jack Foley (born 1940)
- Carolyn Forché (born 1950)
- John M. Ford (1957–2006)
- Sam Walter Foss (1858–1911)
- Sesshu Foster (born 1957)
- Sarah Fox (born 1966)
- FrancEyE (born Frances Elizabeth Dean, 1922–2009), also known as Frances Dean Smith
- Gregory Fraser (born 1963)
- Robert Frazier (born 1951)
- Grace Beacham Freeman (1916–2002)
- Joseph Lewis French (1858–1936)
- Philip Freneau (1752–1832)
- Emily Kendal Frey (born 1976)
- Robert Frost (1874–1963)
- Gwen Frostic (1906–2001)
- Gene Frumkin (1928–2007)
- Nan Fry (1945–2016)
- Gloria Frym (born 1947)
- Alice Fulton (born 1952)

== G ==
- Georgie Starbuck Galbraith (1909–1980)
- Vi Gale (1917–2007)
- Tess Gallagher (born 1943)
- James Galvin (born 1951)
- Forrest Gander (born 1956)
- Isabella Gardner (1915–1981)
- Deborah Garrison (born 1965)
- Dan Gerber (born 1940)
- Amy Gerstler (born 1956)
- Charles Ghigna (Father Goose) (born 1946)
- Andrea Gibson (1975–2025)
- Dobby Gibson (born 1969)
- Jack Gilbert (1925–2012)
- Annie Somers Gilchrist (1841–1912)
- Strickland Gillilan (1869–1954)
- Allen Ginsberg (1926–1997)
- Daniela Gioseffi (born 1941)
- Nikki Giovanni (1943–2024)
- David Gitin (1941–2015)
- Michael Gizzi (1949–2010)
- Peter Gizzi (born 1959)
- Jesse Glass (born 1954)
- Louise Glück (1943–2023)
- Patricia Goedicke (1931–2006)
- Albert Goldbarth (born 1948)
- Kenneth Goldsmith (born 1961)
- Laurence Goldstein (born 1943)
- Jose B. Gonzalez (born 1967)
- Rigoberto González (born 1970)
- Rodolfo Gonzales (1928–2005)
- Goodale Sisters
- Kevin Goodan
- Alice Goodman (born 1958)
- Paul Goodman (1911–1972)
- Hedwig Gorski (born 1949)
- Hannah Flagg Gould (1789–1865)
- Janice Gould (1949–2019)
- David Graham
- Jorie Graham (born 1950)
- Judy Grahn (born 1940)
- Alex Grant
- Adelia Cleopatra Graves (1821–1895)
- Jane Lewers Gray (1796–1871)
- Julia Boynton Green (1861–1957)
- Samuel Green (born 1948)
- Debora Greger (born 1949)
- Linda Gregerson (born 1950)
- Linda Gregg (1942–2019)
- Horace Gregory (1898–1982)
- Robert Grenier (born 1941)
- Susan Griffin (born 1943)
- Hannah Griffitts (1727–1817)
- Mariela Griffor (born 1961)
- Angelina Weld Grimké (1880–1948)
- Charlotte Forten Grimké (1837–1914)
- Allen Grossman (1932–2014)
- Dorothea Grossman (1937–2012)
- Gabriel Gudding (born 1966)
- Charles Guenther (1920–2008)
- Barbara Guest (1920–2006)
- Edgar Guest (1891–1959)
- Louise Imogen Guiney (1861–1920)
- Arthur Guiterman (1871–1943)
- R. S. Gwynn (born 1948)
- Beth Gylys (born 1964)
- Brion Gysin (1916–1986)

== H ==
- H.D. (Hilda Doolittle) (1886–1961)
- Rachel Hadas (born 1948)
- Hermann Hagedorn (1882–1964)
- Jessica Hagedorn (born 1949)
- Lucie Caroline Hager (1853–1903)
- Richard Hague (born 1947)
- Kimiko Hahn (born 1955)
- John Haines (1924–2011)
- Donald Hall (1928–2018)
- Louisa Jane Hall (1802–1892)
- Fitz-Greene Halleck (1790–1867)
- Moyshe-Leyb Halpern (1886–1932)
- Barbara Hamby (born 1952)
- Jupiter Hammon (1711 – c. 1806)
- William Harmon (born 1938)
- Belle R. Harrison (1856–1940)
- Jim Harrison (1937–2017)
- Carla Harryman (born 1952)
- Alamgir Hashmi (born 1951)
- Louis Hasley (1906–1986)
- Robert Bernard Hass (born 1962)
- Robert Hass (born 1941)
- Katherine Hastings
- William K. Hathaway (born 1944)
- Julian Hawthorne (1846–1934)
- Robert Hayden (1913–1980)
- John Russell Hayes (1866–1945)
- Terrance Hayes (born 1971)
- Paul Hamilton Hayne (1830–1886)
- Tony Haynes (born 1960)
- William Shakespeare Hays (1837–1907)
- Steve Healey (born 1966)
- Trebor Healey
- Eloise Klein Healy (born 1943)
- Josephine D. Heard (1861–1924)
- Anthony Hecht (1923–2004)
- Jennifer Michael Hecht (born 1965)
- Allison Hedge Coke (born 1958)
- Lyn Hejinian (born 1941)
- Michael Heller (born 1937)
- Essex Hemphill (1957–1995)
- Alice Corbin Henderson (1881–1949)
- Nancy A. Henry (born 1961)
- S. M. I. Henry (1839–1900)
- Oliver Herford (1863–1935)
- Lee Herrick (born 1970)
- Harvey Hess (1939–2012)
- William Heyen (born 1940)
- Grace Hibbard (c. 1835 – 1911)
- Leland Hickman (1934–1991)
- Bob Hicok (born 1960)
- Dick Higgins (1938–1998)
- Scott Hightower (born 1952)
- Conrad Hilberry (1928–2017)
- Robert Hillyer (1895–1961)
- Ellen Hinsey (born 1960)
- Edward Hirsch (born 1950)
- Jane Hirshfield (born 1953)
- Jack Hirschman (1933–2021)
- George Hitchcock (1914–2010)
- H. L. Hix (born 1960)
- Tony Hoagland (1953–2018)
- Allen Hoey (1952–2010)
- Linda Hogan (born 1947)
- Daniel Hoffman (1923–2013)
- Roald Hoffmann (born 1937)
- John Hollander (1929–2013)
- Bill Holm (1943–2009)
- Bob Holman (born 1948)
- M. Carl Holman (1919–1988)
- Oliver Wendell Holmes Sr. (1809–1894)
- Dennis Holt (born 1942)
- Garrett Hongo (born 1951)
- Edwin Honig (1919–2011)
- Lemuel Hopkins (1750–1801)
- Jay Hopler (born 1970)
- George Moses Horton (1797–1884)
- Joan Houlihan
- Diana Der Hovanessian (1934–2018)
- Richard Howard (1929–2022)
- Robert E. Howard (1906–1936)
- Emeline Harriet Howe (1844–1934)
- Fanny Howe (1940–2025)
- Julia Ward Howe (1819–1910)
- Marie Howe (born 1950)
- Susan Howe (born 1937)
- Elizabeth Orpha Sampson Hoyt (1828–1912)
- Helen Hoyt (1887–1972)
- Detrick Hughes (born 1966)
- Langston Hughes (1902–1967)
- Richard Hugo (1923–1982)
- Constance Hunting (1925–2006)
- Cynthia Huntington
- Siri Hustvedt (born 1955)
- Abby B. Hyde (1799–1872)
- Helen von Kolnitz Hyer (1896–1983)

== I–J ==
- David Ignatow (1914–1997)
- Lawson Fusao Inada (born 1938)
- Arthur Crew Inman (1895–1963)
- P. Inman (born 1947)
- Mary E. Ireland (1834–1927)
- Sarah S. Jacobs (1813–1902)
- Josephine Jacobsen (1908–2003)
- Ethel Jacobson (1899–1991)
- Afdhere Jama (born 1980)
- Maria James (1793–1868)
- J. J. Jameson
- Marc Jampole (born 1950)
- Patricia Janus (1932–2006)
- Lisa Jarnot (born 1967)
- Randall Jarrell (1914–1965)
- Robinson Jeffers (1887–1962)
- Isadore Gilbert Jeffery (1840–1919)
- Paul Jessup (born 1977)
- Ted Joans (1928–2003)
- Orrick Glenday Johns (1887–1946)
- Denis Johnson (1949–2017)
- Georgia Douglas Johnson (1880–1966)
- Helene Johnson (1906–1995)
- James Weldon Johnson (1871–1938)
- Josephine Winslow Johnson (1910–1990)
- Kent Johnson (born 1955)
- Kimberly Johnson (born 1971)
- Robert Underwood Johnson (1853–1937)
- Sallie M. Mills Johnson (1862–1927)
- Richard Jones
- Sarah Jones (born 1973)
- Julie Joosten
- June Jordan (1936–2002)
- Pierre Joris (born 1946)
- Andrew Joron
- Lawrence Joseph (born 1948)
- Matthew Josephson (1899–1978)
- Frank Judge
- Donald Justice (1925–2004)

== K ==
- Jim Kacian (born 1953)
- Mary Elizabeth Kail (1828–1890)
- Sheema Kalbasi (born 1972)
- Chester Kallman (1921–1975)
- Ilya Kaminsky (born 1977)
- Lenore Kandel (1932–2009)
- Vim Karenine (born 1933)
- Mary Karr (born 1955)
- Julia Kasdorf (born 1962)
- Laura Kasischke (born 1961)
- Janet Kauffman (born 1945)
- Herbert Kaufman (1878–1947)
- Shirley Kaufman (1923–2016)
- Sarah Kay (born 1988)
- Phil Kaye
- W. B. Keckler (born 1966)
- John Keene (born 1965)
- Weldon Kees (1914–1955)
- Bill Keith (1929–2004)
- Brigit Pegeen Kelly (born 1951)
- X. J. Kennedy (1929–2026)
- Richard Kenney (born 1948)
- Maurice Kenny (1929–2016)
- Jane Kenyon (1947–1995)
- Jack Kerouac (1922–1969)
- Sophie Kerr (1880–1965)
- Francis Scott Key (1779–1843)
- Laurel Elizabeth Keyes (1907–1983)
- Alicia Keys (born 1981)
- Kerry Shawn Keys (born 1946)
- D. Kildare (1934–2005)
- Aline Murray Kilmer (1888–1941)
- Joyce Kilmer (1886–1918)
- Val Kilmer (born 1959)
- Suji Kwock Kim (born 1969)
- Harriet McEwen Kimball (1834–1917)
- James Kimbrell (born 1967)
- Haven Kimmel (born 1965)
- Burt Kimmelman (born 1947)
- Galway Kinnell (1927–2014)
- Susan Kinsolving
- Mary Kinzie (born 1944)
- David Kirby (born 1944)
- H. T. Kirby-Smith (born 1938)
- Lincoln Kirstein (1907–1996)
- Carolyn Kizer (1925–2014)
- August Kleinzahler (born 1949)
- William Kloefkorn (1932–2011)
- Etheridge Knight (1933–1991)
- Kenneth Koch (1925–2002)
- Ruth Ellen Kocher (born 1965)
- Wayne Koestenbaum (born 1958)
- Yusef Komunyakaa (born 1947)
- Mary Koncel
- Ted Kooser (born 1939)
- Carolyn Kreiter-Foronda (born 1946)
- Alfred Kreymborg (1883–1966)
- Maxine Kumin (1925–2014)
- Stanley Kunitz (1905–2006)
- Laurie Kutchins
- Stephen Kuusisto (born 1955)
- Joanne Kyger (1934–2017)

== L ==
- Philip Lamantia (1927–2005)
- Fran Landesman (1927–2011)
- D. L. Lang (born 1983)
- Joseph Langland (1917–2007)
- Sidney Lanier (1842–1881)
- Rebecca Hammond Lard (1772–1855)
- Bruce Larkin (born 1957)
- Jeremy Larner (1937–2026)
- Dorothea Lasky (born 1978)
- George Parsons Lathrop (1851–1898)
- Richmond Lattimore (1906–1984)
- Sanders Anne Laubenthal (1943–2002)
- James Laughlin (1914–1997)
- Ann Lauterbach (born 1942)
- Dorianne Laux (born 1952)
- James Lavilla-Havelin
- Anne Mary Lawler (1908–1980)
- Margaret Wynne Lawless (1847–1926)
- William P. Lawrence (1930–2005)
- Robert Lax (1915–2000)
- Emma Lazarus (1849–1887)
- David Lee (born 1966)
- Li-Young Lee (born 1957)
- Malka Lee (1904–1976)
- Mary Elizabeth Lee (1819–1849)
- Lemon (born 1975)
- Aya de Leon (born 1967)
- Eleanor Lerman (born 1952)
- Ben Lerner (born 1979)
- David Lerner (1951–1997)
- Jimmy Lerner (born 1951)
- Rika Lesser (born 1953)
- Denise Levertov (1923–1997)
- Dana Levin (born 1965)
- Philip Levine (1928–2015)
- Larry Levis (1946–1996)
- D. A. Levy (1942–1968)
- William Levy (1939–2019)
- Alonzo Lewis (1794–1861)
- Charles Lillard (1944–1997)
- Shirley Geok-lin Lim (born 1944)
- Tao Lin (born 1983)
- Sarah Lindsay (born 1958)
- Vachel Lindsay (1879–1931)
- Amon Liner (1940–1976)
- Sara Jane Lippincott (1823–1904)
- Diane Lockward
- Patricia Lockwood (born 1982)
- George Cabot Lodge (1873–1909)
- Ron Loewinsohn (1937–2014)
- John Logan (1923–1987)
- Lily Augusta Long (1862–1927)
- Naomi Long Madgett (1923–2020)
- James Longenbach
- Henry Wadsworth Longfellow (1807–1882)
- Audre Lorde (1934–1992)
- Marguerite St. Leon Loud (1812–1889)
- Trisha Low
- Amy Lowell (1874–1925)
- James Russell Lowell (1819–1891)
- Maria White Lowell (1821–1853)
- Robert Lowell (1917–1977)
- Walter Lowenfels (1897–1976)
- Mina Loy (1882–1966)
- Felipe Luciano (born 1948)
- Lydia Lunch (born 1959)
- Masiela Lusha (born 1985)
- Thomas Lux (1946–2017)
- Henry Lyman
- William Whittingham Lyman Jr (1885–1983), also known as Jack Lyman
- Thomas Lynch (born 1948)

== M ==
=== Ma–Mm ===
- Jackson Mac Low (1922–2004)
- Lewis MacAdams (1944–2020)
- Carlyle Ferren MacIntyre (1890–1967)
- Percy MacKaye (1875–1956)
- Nathaniel Mackey (born 1947)
- Archibald MacLeish (1892–1982)
- Naomi Long Madgett (1923–2020)
- Haki R. Madhubuti (born 1942)
- John Gillespie Magee Jr. (1922–1941)
- Clarence Major (born 1936)
- Dora Malech (born 1981)
- Taylor Mali (born 1965)
- Douglas Malloch (born 1877)
- Tom Mandel (born 1942)
- Helen Adelia Manville (1839–1912)
- Djelloul Marbrook (born 1934)
- Trista Mateer
- Joseph Moncure March (1899–1977)
- Morton Marcus (1936–2009)
- Paul Mariani (born 1940)
- Edwin Markham (1852–1940)
- Don Marquis (1878–1937)
- Camille Martin (born 1956)
- David Mason (born 1954)
- Matt Mason (born 1962)
- Steve Mason (1940–2005)
- Edgar Lee Masters (1868–1950)
- Harry Mathews (1930–2017)
- William Matthews (1942–1997)
- John Matthias (born 1941)
- Kevin Max (born 1967)
- Julia Harris May (1833–1912)
- Bernadette Mayer (born 1945)
- Frances Mayes (born 1940)
- Ben Mazer (born 1964)
- Janet McAdams (born 1957)
- Robert McAlmon (1895–1956)
- J. D. McClatchy (born 1945)
- Michael McClure (1932–2020)
- Shane McCrae (born 1975)
- Laura McCullough (born 1960)
- Catfish McDaris (born 1953)
- Michael McFee
- Karyna McGlynn (born 1977)
- Michael McGovern (1848–1933)
- Campbell McGrath (born 1962)
- Thomas McGrath (1916–1990)
- Heather McHugh (born 1948)
- Claude McKay (1889–1948)
- Louis McKee (1951–2011)
- Rod McKuen (1933–2015)
- Paula McLain (born 1965)
- Georgie A. Hulse McLeod (1827–1890)
- James McMichael (born 1939)
- Wesley McNair (born 1941)
- Louise McNeill (1911–1993)
- Joyelle McSweeney (born 1977)
- Alexander Beaufort Meek (1814–1865)
- Abel Meeropol (1903–1986), also known as Lewis Allan
- David Meltzer (1937–2016)
- Herman Melville (1819–1890)
- Samuel Menashe (1925–2011)
- Nancy Mercado (born 1959)
- William Meredith (1919–2007)
- Billy Merrell (born 1982)
- Eve Merriam (1916–1992)
- Christopher Merrill (born 1957)
- Helen Maud Merrill (1865–1943)
- James Merrill (1926–1995)
- Stuart Merrill (1863–1915)
- Donna Marie Merritt (born 1965)
- Thomas Merton (1915–1968)
- W. S. Merwin (1927–2019)
- Tom Meschery (born 1938)
- Sharon Mesmer (born 1960)
- Sarah Messer (born 1966)
- Henry Meyer (1840–1925)
- Robert Mezey (1935–2020)
- William Michaelian (born 1956)
- Diane Middlebrook (1939–2007)
- Josephine Miles (1911–1985)
- Joseph Millar
- Edna St. Vincent Millay (1892–1950)
- Alice Duer Miller (1874–1942)
- Greg Miller (born 1957)
- Jane Miller (born 1949)
- Jen Miller (born 1972)
- Joaquin Miller (1837–1913)
- Leslie Adrienne Miller (born 1956)
- May Miller (1899–1995)
- Minnie Myrtle Miller (1842–1882)
- Nellie Burget Miller (1875–1952)
- Tim Miller (born 1958)
- Vassar Miller (1924–1998)
- Tyler Mills (born 1983)
- S. Isadore Miner (1863–1910)
- Deborah A. Miranda
- Gary Miranda (born 1939)
- Janice Mirikitani (1941–2021)
- John Kearsley Mitchell (1798–1858)
- Susan Mitchell (born 1944)

=== Mn–Mz ===
- Anis Mojgani (born 1977)
- Paul Monette (1945–1995)
- Mong-Lan
- Marion Montgomery (1925–2011)
- Melissa Morphew (born 1963)
- José Montoya (1932–2013)
- William Vaughn Moody (1869–1910)
- Clara Jessup Moore (1824–1899)
- Charles Leonard Moore (1854–1925)
- Daniel Moore (born 1940)
- Jacqueline S. Moore (1926–2002)
- Jessica Care Moore (born 1971)
- Julia A. Moore (1847–1920)
- Marianne Moore (1887–1972)
- Milcah Martha Moore (1740–1829)
- Pat Mora (born 1942)
- Barbara Moraff (born 1939)
- George Frederick Morgan (1922–2004)
- A. F. Moritz (born 1947)
- Hilda Morley (1916–1998)
- Richard Morris (1939–2003)
- Tracie Morris
- Jim Morrison (1943–1971)
- Bradford Morrow (born 1951)
- Elizabeth Cutter Morrow (1873–1955)
- Viggo Mortensen (born 1958)
- Howard Moss (1922–1987)
- Thylias Moss (born 1954)
- Stephen Motika (born 1977)
- Louise Chandler Moulton (1835–1908)
- Anna Cora Mowatt (1819–1870)
- Jennifer Moxley (born 1964)
- Lisel Mueller (1924–2020)
- Harryette Mullen (born 1953)
- William D. Mundell (1912–1997)
- Charles Muñoz (1926–2018)
- David Mura (born 1952)
- Erin Murphy
- Sheila Murphy (born 1951)
- Pauli Murray (1910–1985)
- Christopher Mwashinga (born 1965)
- Eileen Myles (born 1949)

== N ==
- Vladimir Nabokov (1899–1977)
- Angel Nafis (born 1988)
- Ogden Nash (1902–1971)
- John Neal (1793–1876)
- John Neihardt (1881–1973)
- Jill Neimark
- Howard Nemerov (1920–1991)
- Arthur Nersesian (born 1958)
- Kenn Nesbitt (born 1962)
- F. A. Nettelbeck (1950–2011)
- Annie Neugebauer
- Aimee Nezhukumatathil (born 1974)
- Rebecca S. Nichols (born 1819)
- Claire Nicolas White (1925–2020)
- Lorine Niedecker (1903–1970)
- Audrey Niffenegger (born 1963)
- John Frederick Nims (1913–1999)
- Lucille Nixon (1908–1963)
- Eric "Big Daddy" Nord (1919–1989)
- Jessica Nordell
- Charles North (born 1941)
- Jessica Nelson North (1891–1988)
- Jim Northrup (born 1943)
- Harry Northup (born 1940)
- Morilla M. Norton (1865–1916)
- Alice Notley (1945–2025)
- Naomi Shihab Nye (born 1952)

== O ==
- Sara Louisa Oberholtzer (1841–1930)
- Edward Joseph Harrington O'Brien (1890–1941)
- Geoffrey G. O'Brien (born 1969)
- Ed Ochester (born 1939)
- Jessie Fremont O'Donnell (1860–1897)
- Blanche Oelrichs (1890–1950)
- Ron Offen (1930–2010)
- Frank O'Hara (1926–1966)
- Sharon Olds (born 1942)
- Martha Capps Oliver (1845–1917)
- Mary Oliver (1935–2019)
- Alix Olson (born 1975)
- Charles Olson (1910–1970)
- George Oppen (1908–1984)
- Mary Oppen (1908–1990)
- James Oppenheim (1882–1932)
- Joel Oppenheimer (1930–1988), also known as Jacob Hammer
- Peter Oresick (1955–2016)
- Gregory Orr (born 1947)
- Alicia Ostriker (born 1937)

== P ==
- Ron Padgett (born 1942)
- Luis Palés Matos (1898–1959)
- Grace Paley (1922–2007)
- Cheryl Pallant
- Condé Benoist Pallen (1858–1929)
- Fanny Purdy Palmer (1839–1923)
- Michael Palmer (born 1943)
- Jay Parini (born 1948)
- Dorothy Parker (1893–1967)
- Lee Passarella
- Linda Pastan (1932–2023)
- Kenneth Patchen (1911–1972)
- Josephine Preston Peabody (1874–1922)
- Richard Peabody
- Molly Peacock (born 1947)
- Harry Thurston Peck (1856–1914)
- Dr. Lucy Creemer Peckham (1842–1923)
- V. Penelope Pelizzon
- Bryan Penberthy (born 1976)
- Rob Penny (1941–2003)
- James Gates Percival (1795–1856)
- William Alexander Percy (1885–1942)
- Eleanor Percy Lee (1819–1849)
- Sam Pereira (born 1949)
- Bob Perelman (born 1947)
- Lucia Perillo (1958–2016)
- Mary Elizabeth Perley (1863–?)
- Alice N. Persons (born 1952)
- Alice E. Heckler Peters (1845–1921)
- Robert Peters (1924–2014)
- Anna Augusta Von Helmholtz-Phelan (1890–1964)
- Carl Phillips (born 1959)
- Marge Piercy (born 1936)
- Nick Piombino (born 1942)
- Robert Pinsky (1940)
- Anthony Piccione (1939–2001)
- Michelle Naka Pierce (born 1968)
- John Pierpont (1785–1866)
- Josephine Pinckney (1895–1957)
- Edward Coote Pinkney (1802–1828)
- Clarissa Pinkola Estés (born 1945)
- Sylvia Plath (1932–1963)
- Edgar Allan Poe (1809–1849)
- Lanny Poffo (born 1954)
- Robert Polito (born 1951)
- Felix Pollak (1909–1987)
- Ralph Pomeroy (1926–1999)
- Paul Martínez Pompa
- Jenny Lind Porter (1927–2020)
- Jim Powell (born 1951)
- Prentice Powell
- Marie Ponsot (1921–2019)
- Marion Manville Pope (1859–1930)
- Carol Potter
- Charles Potts (1943)
- Ezra Pound (1885–1972)
- Emily Browne Powell (1847–1938)
- Kevin Powell (born 1966)
- Julien de Lallande Poydras (1746–1824)
- Jack Prelutsky (1940)
- Elizabeth Prentiss (1818–1878)
- Reynolds Price (1933–2011)
- Frederic Prokosch (1909–1989)
- Kevin Prufer (born 1969)

== Q ==
- George Quasha (born 1942)

== R ==
- Kevin Rabas
- Burton Raffel (1928–2015)
- Sam Ragan (1915–1996)
- Carl Rakosi (1903–2004)
- Lee Ranaldo (born 1956)
- Dudley Randall (1914–2000)
- James Ryder Randall (1839–1908)
- Julia Randall (1924–2005)
- Claudia Rankine (born 1963)
- John Crowe Ransom (1888–1974)
- Ron Rash (born 1953)
- Stephen Ratcliffe (born 1948)
- David Ray (born 1932)
- Paul Ré (born 1950)
- Thomas Buchanan Read (1822–1872)
- Janice Rebibo (born 1950)
- Byron Herbert Reece (1917–1958)
- Spencer Reece
- Anna M. Morrison Reed (1849/50–1921)
- Ishmael Reed (born 1938)
- Ennis Rees (1925–2009)
- Lizette Woodworth Reese (1856–1935)
- James Reiss (1941–2016)
- Naomi Replansky (1918–2023)
- Paul Reps (1895–1990)
- Carter Revard (1931–2022)
- Donald Revell (born 1954)
- Eben E. Rexford (1848–1916)
- Kenneth Rexroth (1905–1982)
- Charles Reznikoff (1894–1976)
- William Henry Rhodes (1822–1876)
- René Ricard (1946–2014)
- Cale Young Rice (1872–1943)
- Rosella Rice (1827–1888)
- Stan Rice (1942–2002)
- Adrienne Rich (1929–2012)
- Beah Richards (1920–2000)
- Laura E. Richards (1850–1943)
- William Nauns Ricks (1876–1948)
- Lola Ridge (1873–1941)
- Laura Riding (1901–1991)
- Charles P. Ries (born 1952)
- James Whitcomb Riley (1849–1916)
- Alberto Ríos (born 1952)
- Laura Jacinta Rittenhouse (1841–1911)
- Tomás Rivera (1935–1984)
- Richard Robbins
- Howard W. Robertson (born 1947)
- Edwin Arlington Robinson (1869–1935)
- Edouard Roditi (1910–1992)
- Luis J. Rodriguez (born 1954)
- Theodore Roethke (1908–1963)
- Pattiann Rogers (born 1940)
- Matthew Rohrer (born 1970)
- Henry Rollins (born 1961)
- Adelaide Day Rollston (1854–1941)
- David Romtvedt
- Raymond Roseliep (1917–1983)
- Franklin Rosemont (1943–2009)
- J. Allyn Rosser (born 1957)
- Terry Rossio (born 1960)
- Jerome Rothenberg (born 1931)
- Michael Rothenberg (born 1951)
- Anne Rouse (born 1954)
- Thomas Rowley (1721–1796)
- Gibbons Ruark (born 1941)
- Ellen Sergeant Rude (1838–1916)
- Mary Ruefle (born 1952)
- Muriel Rukeyser (1913–1980)
- Nipsey Russell (1918–2005)
- Archibald Rutledge (1883–1973)
- Carl Hancock Rux
- Abram Joseph Ryan (1838–1886)
- Kay Ryan (born 1945)
- Michael Ryan (born 1946)

== S ==
=== Sa–Sm ===
- Benjamin Alire Sáenz (born 1954)
- Albert Saijo (1926–2011)
- Michael Salinger (born 1962)
- Mary Jo Salter (born 1954)
- Benjamin Saltman (1927–1999)
- Francis Saltus Saltus (1849–1889)
- Carl Sandburg (1878–1967)
- Robert Charles Sands (1799–1832)
- Sherod Santos (born 1948)
- Aram Saroyan (born 1943)
- May Sarton (1912–1995)
- Mary Stebbins Savage (1850–1915)
- Minot Judson Savage (1841–1918)
- Jeannine Savard (born 1950)
- Caroline Mehitable Fisher Sawyer (1812–1894)
- John Godfrey Saxe (1816–1887)
- Gitl Schaechter-Viswanath (born 1958)
- Hermann Georg Scheffauer (1876–1927)
- Peter Schjeldahl (born 1942)
- Michael Schmidt (born 1947)
- Dennis Schmitz (1937–2019)
- Gjertrud Schnackenberg (born 1953)
- Elio Schneeman (1961–1997)
- Dan Schneider (born 1965)
- Pat Schneider (1934–2020)
- Jane Johnston Schoolcraft (1800–1842)
- Philip Schultz (born 1945)
- Susan Polis Schutz (born 1944)
- James Schuyler (1923–1991)
- Delmore Schwartz (1913–1966)
- Patricia Roth Schwartz (born 1946)
- Armand Schwerner (1927–1999)
- Peter Seaton (1942–2010)
- Alan Seeger (1888–1916)
- Calvin Seerveld (born 1930)
- Frederick Seidel (born 1936)
- Hugh Seidman (born 1940)
- Rebecca Seiferle
- Martha Serpas
- Diane Seuss (born 1956)
- Dr. Seuss (Theodor Seuss Geisel) (1904–1991)
- Elizabeth Sewell (1919–2001)
- Anne Sexton (1928–1974)
- Tom Sexton (born 1940)
- Ntozake Shange (1948–2018)
- Ravi Shankar (born 1975)
- Mary Eulalie Fee Shannon (1824–1855)
- David Shapiro (born 1947)
- Karl Shapiro (1913–2000)
- G. S. Sharat Chandra (1935–2000)
- Brenda Shaughnessy (born 1970)
- Scott Shaw (born 1958)
- Robert Shelby (1935–2016)
- Kate Brownlee Sherwood (1841–1914)
- Dora Adele Shoemaker (1873–1962)
- Aaron Shurin (born 1947)
- Eli Siegel (1902–1978)
- Lydia Sigourney (1791–1865)
- Eleni Sikelianos
- Richard Siken (born 1967)
- Leslie Marmon Silko (born 1948)
- Edward Rowland Sill (1841–1887)
- Hilda Siller (1861–1945)
- Ron Silliman (born 1946)
- Murray Silverstein (born 1943)
- Shel Silverstein (1930–1999)
- Charles Simic (1938–2023)
- Jim Simmerman (1952–2006)
- William Gilmore Simms (1806–1870)
- Marge Simon (born 1942)
- Louis Simpson (1923–2012)
- Bennie Lee Sinclair (1939–2000)
- Carrie Bell Sinclair (1839–1883)
- John Sinclair (born 1941)
- Hal Sirowitz (born 1949)
- Judith Skillman (born 1954)
- Myra Sklarew (born 1934)
- Ed Skoog (born 1971)
- Clark Ashton Smith (1893–1961)
- Elbert H. Smith
- Elizabeth Oakes Smith (1806–1893)
- Langdon Smith (1858–1908)
- Jeanie Oliver Davidson Smith (1836–1925)
- Marc Smith (born 1949)
- Margaret Smith (born 1948)
- Martha Pearson Smith (1836–1912)
- Patti Smith (born 1946)
- R. T. Smith (born 1947)
- Rod Smith (born 1962)
- Rolland Smith (born 1941)
- Tracy K. Smith (born 1972)
- William Jay Smith (1918–2015)

=== Sn–Sz ===
- W. D. Snodgrass (1926–2009)
- Eliza R. Snow (1804–1887)
- Gary Snyder (born 1930)
- Laurel Snyder (born 1974)
- Gustaf Sobin (1935–2005)
- Roberto Solis (born 1945)
- Gilbert Sorrentino (1929–2006)
- Gary Soto (born 1952)
- Juliana Spahr (born 1966)
- Harriet Mabel Spalding (1862–1935)
- Susan Marr Spalding (1841–1908)
- Anne Spencer (1882–1975)
- Jack Spicer (1925–1965)
- Harriet Elizabeth Prescott Spofford (1835–1921)
- Cornelia Laws St. John (?–1902)
- Kim Stafford (born 1949)
- William Stafford (1914–1993)
- Ann Stanford (1916–1987)
- Frank Stanford (1948–1978)
- Henry Throop Stanton (1834–1899)
- George Starbuck (1931–1996)
- William Force Stead (1884–1967)
- Edmund Clarence Stedman (1833–1908)
- Elizabeth Clementine Stedman (1810–1889)
- Rowena Granice Steele (1824–1901)
- Evaleen Stein (1863–1923)
- Gertrude Stein (1874–1946)
- Edward Steinhardt (born 1961)
- Mattie Stepanek (1990–2004)
- Elizabeth Willisson Stephen (1856–1925)
- George Sterling (1869–1926)
- Gerald Stern (1925–2022)
- Augusta Emma Stetson (1842–1928)
- C. J. Stevens (1927–2021)
- James Thomas Stevens (born 1966)
- Wallace Stevens (1880–1955)
- Anne Stevenson (1933–2020)
- Margo Taft Stever
- Joffre Stewart (1925–2019)
- Susan Stewart (born 1952)
- Trumbull Stickney (1874–1904)
- John Stigall (1951–2009)
- James Still (1906–2001)
- Cornelia Laws St. John (died 1902)
- Annis Boudinot Stockton (1736–1801)
- Charles Warren Stoddard (1843–1909)
- Lavinia Stoddard (1787–1820)
- Dejan Stojanović (born 1959)
- Donna J. Stone (1933–1994)
- Ruth Stone (1915–2011)
- Lisa Gluskin Stonestreet (born 1968)
- William Wetmore Story (1819–1895)
- Mark Strand (1934–2014)
- Joseph Stroud (born 1943)
- Lucien Stryk (1924–2013)
- Jesse Stuart (1907–1984)
- Elma Stuckey (1907–1988)
- Melissa Studdard (born 1969)
- Shawn Sturgeon (born 1965)
- Julie Suk (1924–2025)
- Aloysius Michael Sullivan (1896–1980)
- Sekou Sundiata (1948–2007)
- Barton Sutter
- Thomas Burnett Swann (1928–1976)
- John Swanwick (1740–1798)
- Robert Sward (1933–2022)
- Cole Swensen (born 1955)
- Karen Swenson (born 1936)
- May Swenson (1913–1989)
- Thomas Thackeray Swinburne (1865–1926)
- Arthur Sze (born 1950)

== T ==
- Eileen Tabios (born 1960)
- John Taggart (born 1942)
- Ronald Talney
- Amber Tamblyn (born 1983)
- Ronald Phillip Tanaka (1944–2007)
- Luci Tapahonso (born 1953)
- Nathaniel Tarn (1928–2024)
- Allen Tate (1899–1979)
- James Tate (1943–2015)
- Bayard Taylor (1825–1878)
- Bert Leston Taylor (1866–1921)
- Edward Taylor (1645–1729)
- Elkanah East Taylor (1888–1945)
- Minnetta Theodora Taylor (1860–1911)
- Angeline Teal (1842–1913)
- Michelle Tea (born 1971)
- Sara Teasdale (1884–1933)
- Michael Teig (born 1968)
- Todd Temkin (born 1964)
- Elaine Terranova (born 1939)
- Lucy Terry (c. 1730–1821)
- Steve Tesich (1942–1996)
- Celia Thaxter (1835–1894)
- Ernest Thayer (1863–1940)
- Scofield Thayer (1889–1982)
- William Roscoe Thayer (1859–1923)
- Edith M. Thomas (1854–1925)
- Lewis Thomas (1913–1993)
- Lorenzo Thomas (1944–2005)
- Clara Ann Thompson (1869–1949)
- Dunstan Thompson (1918–1975)
- E. S. L. Thompson (1848–1944)
- Lady Gwen Thompson (1928–1986)
- Maurice Thompson (1844–1901)
- William Irwin Thompson (1938–2020)
- Henry David Thoreau (1817–1862)
- Tamara Thorne (born 1957)
- Laura M. Hawley Thurston (1812–1842)
- Gary Tillery (born 1947)
- Richard Tillinghast (born 1940)
- Lydia H. Tilton (1839–1915)
- Henry Timrod (1828–1867)
- Melvin B. Tolson (1898–1966)
- Lee Tonouchi (born c. 1972)
- Nick Tosches (1949–2019)
- Tony Tost (born 1975)
- Ann Townsend (born 1962)
- Patricia Traxler
- William Tremblay (born 1940)
- Natasha Trethewey (born 1966)
- Tony Trigilio (born 1966)
- David Trinidad (born 1953)
- Amélie Rives Troubetzkoy (1863–1945)
- Quincy Troupe (born 1939)
- John Trumbull (1750–1831)
- Mary Frances Tyler Tucker (1837–1902)
- Frederick Goddard Tuckerman (1821–1873)
- Lewis Turco (born 1934)
- Brian Turner (born 1967)
- Genya Turovskaya
- Emma Rood Tuttle (1839–1916)
- Chase Twichell (born 1950)
- Sarah Lowe Twiggs (1839–1920)
- E. Donald Two-Rivers (d. 2008)

== U–V ==
- Louis Untermeyer (1885–1977)
- John Updike (1932–2009)
- Charles Upton (born 1948)
- Amy Uyematsu (1947–2023)
- Catherynne M. Valente (born 1979)
- Jean Valentine (1934–2020)
- Sallie Ada Vance (ca. 1840 – unknown)
- Cor van den Heuvel (born 1931)
- Mark Van Doren (1894–1972)
- Mona Van Duyn (1921–2004)
- Ellen Oliver Van Fleet (1842–1893)
- Sheldon Vanauken (1914–1996)
- Robert Vasquez (born 1955)
- Reetika Vazirani (1962–2003)
- Janine Pommy Vega (1942–2010)
- Jones Very (1813–1880)
- George Sylvester Viereck (1884–1962)
- Peter Viereck (1916–2006)
- Nick Virgilio (1928–1989)
- Gerald Vizenor (born 1934)
- Judith Vollmer (born 1951)

== W ==
- Madge Morris Wagner (1862–1924)
- Buddy Wakefield (born 1974)
- Diane Wakoski (born 1937)
- Diane Wald
- Anne Waldman (born 1945)
- Rosmarie Waldrop (born 1935)
- Keith Waldrop (1932–2023)
- Alice Walker (born 1944)
- Margaret Walker (1915–1998)
- Minnie Gow Walsworth (1859–1947)
- Connie Wanek (born 1952)
- BJ Ward (born 1967)
- Diane Ward (born 1956)
- Julia Rush Cutler Ward (1796–1824)
- Katharine Augusta Ware (1797–1813)
- Mary Ware (writer) (1828–1915)
- Catherine Anne Warfield (1816–1877)
- Emily Warn
- Robert Penn Warren (1905–1989)
- Raees Warsi (born 1963)
- William John Watkins (born 1942)
- Barrett Watten (born 1948)
- Jim Webb (1945–2018)
- Rebecca Wee
- Eliot Weinberger (born 1949)
- Hannah Weiner (1928–1997)
- ruth weiss (1928–2020)
- Theodore Weiss (1916–2003)
- James Welch (1940–2003)
- Lew Welch (1926–c. 1971)
- Joe Wenderoth (born 1966)
- Marjory Heath Wentworth (born 1958)
- Kanye West (born 1977)
- Paul West (1930–2015)
- Philip Whalen (1923–2002)
- Mark Whalon (1886–1956)
- John Wheatcroft (1925–2017)
- Phillis Wheatley (1753–1784)
- Cora Stuart Wheeler (1852–1897)
- John Hall Wheelock (1886–1978)
- John Brooks Wheelwright (1897–1940)
- Edward Lucas White (1866–1934)
- Laura Rosamond White (1844–1922)
- Gary J. Whitehead (born 1965)
- Ruth Whitman (1922–1999)
- Walt Whitman (1819–1892)
- Adeline Dutton Train Whitney (1824–1906)
- Reed Whittemore (1919–2012)
- John Greenleaf Whittier (1807–1892)
- Margaret Widdemer (1884–1978)
- John Wieners (1934–2002)
- Richard Wilbur (1921–2017)
- Carlos Wilcox (1794–1827)
- Ella Wheeler Wilcox (1850–1919)
- Peter Wild (1940–2009)
- Richard Henry Wilde (1789–1847)
- Charlotte Wilder (1898–1980)
- Charles Willeford (1919–1988)
- C. K. Williams (1936–2015)
- Jonathan Williams (1929–2008)
- Oscar Williams (1900–1964)
- Paul O. Williams (1935–2009)
- Philip Lee Williams (born 1950)
- William Carlos Williams (1883–1963)
- Elizabeth Willis (born 1961)
- Nathaniel Parker Willis (1806–1867)
- Eleanor Wilner (born 1937)
- Anne Elizabeth Wilson (1901–1946)
- Dede Wilson (born 1937)
- Edmund Wilson (1895–1972)
- Ibbie McColm Wilson (1834–1908)
- Peter Lamborn Wilson (born 1945), also known as Hakim Bey
- Christian Wiman (born 1966)
- Dale Wimbrow (1895–1954)
- Vernice Wineera (born 1938)
- Anne Winters
- Yvor Winters (1900–1968)
- Jeneverah M. Winton (1837–1904)
- Sam Witt (born 1970)
- Larry Woiwode (born 1941)
- John Barton Wolgamot (c. 1910 – c. 1980)
- Nellie Wong (born 1934)
- John Wood (1947–2022)
- George Edward Woodberry (1855–1930)
- Eddie Woods (born 1940)
- Samuel Woodworth (1784–1842)
- Gamel Woolsey (1895–1968)
- Abba Goold Woolson (1838–1921)
- Bryan Thao Worra (born 1973)
- Patience Worth (Pearl Lenore Curran) (1883–1937)
- Jane T. Worthington (1821–1847)
- C. D. Wright (1949–2016)
- Charles Wright (born 1935)
- Franz Wright (1953–2015)
- James Wright (1927–1980)
- Jay Wright (born 1935)
- Kirby Wright
- Richard Wright (1908–1960)
- Susanna Wright (1697–1784)
- Robert Wrigley (born 1951)
- Elinor Wylie (1885–1928)

== X–Z ==
- Wendy Xu (born 1987)
- Mitsuye Yamada (born 1923)
- Lois-Ann Yamanaka (born 1961)
- Leo Yankevich (born 1961)
- John Yau (born 1950)
- Al Young (1939–2021)
- C. Dale Young (born 1969)
- Dean Young (born 1955)
- Kevin Young (born 1970)
- Matthew Zapruder (born 1967)
- Marya Zaturenska (1902–1982)
- Andrew Zawacki (born 1972)
- Calvin Ziegler (1854–1930)
- Joaquin Zihuatanejo (born 1971)
- Louis Zukofsky (1904–1978)

== See also ==
- Academy of American Poets
- American poetry
- List of English-language poets
- List of Jewish American poets
- List of poets
- List of years in poetry
- Poetry Foundation
- Poetry Society of America
