= The Jargon Society =

- Parent company: Black Mountain College Museum + Arts Center
- Founded: 1951
- Founder: Jonathan Williams and David Ruff
- Country of origin: United States
- Headquarters location: Asheville, North Carolina
- Publication types: Books
- Official website: www.blackmountaincollege.org/the-jargon-society/

The Jargon Society is an independent press founded by the American poet Jonathan Williams. Jargon is one of the oldest and most prestigious small presses in the United States and has published seminal works of the American literary avant-garde, including books by Charles Olson, Louis Zukofsky, Paul Metcalf, James Broughton, and Williams himself, as well as sui generis books of folk art such as White Trash Cooking.

Though most of Jargon's writers are either cult figures or genuine obscurities, the books themselves are often intricately designed deluxe editions. Guy Davenport described the Jargon Society as "a paradoxical fusion of fine printing and samizdat diffusion."

== History ==
The Jargon Society was founded in 1951 by Jonathan Williams and David Ruff in a San Francisco Chinese restaurant. Jargon 1 was the first work to be published by the small press, consisting of Williams' poem "Garbage Litters the Iron face of the Sun’s Child" and an etching by Ruff, made into a folded pamphlet. Only 150 copies were produced. Jargon 2, published in the same year, was called "The Dancer," and contained a poem by Joel Oppenheimer and a drawing by Robert Rauschenberg. Williams continued publishing works from fellow students and teachers while attending Black Mountain College in Black Mountain, North Carolina. Williams enjoyed publishing writers and artists that were considered "underdogs," often encouraging collaboration between them. His predilection to champion outsiders in art and literature earned Williams the epithet "custodian of snowflakes" from literary critic Hugh Kenner.

The press has published many influential works of the literary avant-garde, including The Maximus Poems by Charles Olson and The Neugents by David M. Spear. Jargon passed down the opportunity to publish the now Beat Generation classic, Howl, by Allen Ginsberg.

One of the most well-known titles published by Jargon was White Trash Cooking by Ernest Matthew Mickler. This cookbook, which had been rejected by publishers in the Northeast before its publication by Jargon, was such a success that the small press could not keep up with orders. After a month, unable to keep up with demand, Jargon sold the rights to Ten Speed Press for $90,000 and a 15% royalties clause.

Jargon has also sponsored many programs in literature and the arts, providing support for poets, photographers, and others "who are deserving but not recognized."

The Jargon Society's inventory and rights were given to the Black Mountain College Museum + Arts Center soon after Williams' passing in 2008. The museum has continued publication under the imprint. As of 2019, there are 115 Jargon titles, including 85 books and 30 broadsides, pamphlets, and other types of work. The most recent publication is The Black Mountain College Anthology of Poetry, produced in collaboration with the University of North Carolina Press.

== Notable titles ==
See Jargon Society: A Checklist for a full list of publications. Some of the more notable titles are:

- The Dancer, Joel Oppenheimer (1951).
- Fables and Other Little Tales, Kenneth Patchen (1953).
- The Maximus Poems 1-10, Charles Olson (1953).
- The Immoral Proposition, Robert Creeley (1953).
- The Maximus Poems 11-22, Charles Olson (1956).
- All That Is Lovely in Men, Robert Creeley (1955).
- Some Time, Louis Zukofsky (1956).
- Will West, Paul Metcalf (1956).
- Passage, Michael McClure (1956).
- The Improved Binoculars: Selected Poems, Irving Layton (1956).
- The Dutiful Son, Joel Oppenheimer (1956).
- Hurrah for Anything: Poems and Drawings, Kenneth Patchen (1957).
- the Whip, Robert Creeley (1957).
- Lunar Baedeker & Time-Tables, Mina Loy (1958).
- Letters: Poems MCMLIII-MCMLVI, Robert Duncan (1958).
- Overland to the Islands, Denise Levertov (1958).
- 1450-1950, Bob Brown (1959), with Corinth Books.
- Jargon 31: 14 Poets, 1 Artist (1958) - Poems by Paul Blackburn, Bob Brown, Edward Dahlberg, Max Finstein, Allen Ginsberg, Paul Goodman, Denise Levertov, Walter Lowenfels, Edward Marshall, EA Navaretta, Joel Oppenheimer, Gilbert Sorrentino, Jonathan Williams, Louis Zukofsky, each with a drawing by Fielding Dawson.
- A Form of Woman, Robert Creeley (1959), with Corinth Books.
- The Maximus Poems, Charles Olson (1960), with Corinth Books.
- On My Eyes, Larry Eigner (1960).
- The Darkness Surrounds Us, Gilbert Sorrentino (1960).
- Untitled Epic Poem on the History of Industrialization, Buckminster Fuller (1962).
- A Test of Poetry, Louis Zukofsky (1964).
- A Line of Poetry, a Row of Trees, Ronald Johnson (1964).
- Genoa: A Telling of Wonders, Paul Metcalf (1965).
- Flowers and Leaves, Guy Davenport (1966).
- T&G: The Collected Poems (1936-1966), Lorine Niedecker (1969).
- The Spirit Walks, the Rocks Will Talk: Eccentric Translations form Two Eccentrics, Ronald Johnson (1969).
- Plum Poems, Ross Feld (1971).
- Patagonia, Paul Metcalf (1971).
- The Appalachian photographs of Doris Ulmann, Doris Ulmann (1971).
- A Long Undressing: Collected Poems, 1949-1969, James Broughton (1971).
- Spring of the Lamb, Douglas Woolf (1972).
- Epitaphs for Lorine, Jonathan Williams (1973).
- The Family Album of Lucybelle Carter, Ralph Eugene Meatyard (1974).
- The Middle Passage: A Triptych of Commodities, Paul Metcalf (1976).
- Madeira & Toasts for Basil Bunting's 75th Birthday, ed. Jonathan Williams (1977).
- Elite/Elate Poems: Selected Poems 1971-75, Jonathan Williams (1979).
- Just Friends/Friends and Lovers: Poems 1959-1962, Joel Oppenheimer (1980).
- Both, Paul Metcalf (1982).
- Sappho’s Raft (le rideau de la Mytilénienne), Thomas Meyer (1982); not to be confused with Sappho by Meyer, published by Coracle Press.
- White Trash Cooking, Ernest Matthew Mickler (1986).
- Names & Local Habitations: Selected Earlier Poems 1951-1972, Joel Oppenheimer (1988).
- Bill Anthony’s Greatest Hits., William Anthony (1988).
- At Dusk Iridescent: A Gathering of Poems 1972-1997, Thomas Meyer (1999).
