= Alfred Starr Hamilton =

American poet

Alfred Starr Hamilton (June 14, 1914 – 2005) was an American poet, who contributed to many small presses, including Epoch, New Directions, Foxfire, New Letters, Archive, Poetry Now, American Poetry Review and Greenfield Review. His work has been championed by Jonathan Williams and Ron Silliman and his poetry was included in the first issue of Thomas Merton's Monk's Pond.

The first full-length collection of his poetry (and the only one to appear in Hamilton's lifetime) was The Poems of Alfred Starr Hamilton, was published in 1970 by The Jargon Society as Jargon 49.

A lifelong resident of Montclair, New Jersey, Hamilton attended but never graduated from Montclair High School, and in later years sent frequent and unusual letters to the Montclair Police Department.

== Bibliography ==
- Sphinx (1968)
- The Poems of Alfred Starr Hamilton (1970) (ASIN: B000FAC1IY)
- The Big Parade (1982)
- A Dark Dreambox of Another Kind: The Poems of Alfred Starr Hamilton (2013) (ISBN 0988464306)
