= Hasleby =

Hasleby is a surname. Notable people with the surname include:

- James Hasleby (1833–1903), English convict
- Paul Hasleby (born 1981), Australian rules footballer

== See also ==
- Hasley
- Hässelby, town in Sweden
