= Joshua Field (artist) =

American artist

- Born: October 27, 1973 (age 52); North Adams, Massachusetts, U.S.
- Education: Maryland Institute College of Art, Baltimore
- Known for: Painting, sculpture

Joshua Field (born October 27, 1973) is an American artist known for narrative paintings which use iconic and psychological imagery to create complex sometimes mysterious scenarios. He exhibits his paintings in the United States and Europe.

Many of Field's best-known artworks utilize the visual language of collage to bring a broad range of disparate images into a narrative scheme. His early work incorporated found objects and made use of popular imagery, referencing the transition period between Abstract Expressionism and Pop Art when artists like Robert Rauschenberg and Larry Rivers used both lyrical brush strokes and popular imagery in their work. Later, Field's paintings developed a more personal symbolism in which certain characters or objects appear more frequently. His current work is deeply symbolic and often contains references to classical mythology in addition to extensive personal symbolism.

Field lives and maintains a studio in North Adams, Massachusetts.

== Life and work ==
In 1973 Joshua Field was born in the Berkshires of western Massachusetts. He spent his formative years in St. Petersburg, Florida where he attended Gibbs High School and enrolled in the Pinellas County Center for the Arts, a competitive four-year magnet program for the arts that accepts students through portfolio and on-site skills review . This formed Field's classical foundation but also introduced him to the Proto-Pop period in American Art, a time when abstract expressionism clashed with the introduction of the found objects and assimilated commercial imagery of the pop movement. Florida's gulf coast is a haven for the proto-pop elite, including Robert Rauschenberg and James Rosenquist.

Field later attended the Maryland Institute College of Art in Baltimore where he expanded his education. At MICA, he focused on assemblage/collage and poetry, and was mentored by Joe Cardarelli, a renowned beat poet and friend of Allen Ginsberg, Andrei Codrescu, Anselm Hollo and Robert Creeley. Field connected readily with poetry as alternative narrative structures and an ideal analogue for narrative symbolic imagery.

In 1996, Field moved back to the Berkshires. He currently maintains a studio in North Adams, Massachusetts, home to the largest contemporary art museum on the east coast, the Massachusetts Museum of Contemporary Art. He has exhibited nationally and internationally, from Chelsea in New York City to Berlin, Germany.

Field is known for poetically driven narrative paintings that are iconic, psychological and subversive. Arrays of archetypal imagery culled from both the collective consciousness and the realm of the intensely personal portray both sociological issues and mythic individual dramas.

Georgia Fee, co-founder and owner of ArtSlant.com, said of Field's work:

His paintings and drawings mix an abstract expressionist focus on surface with a wonderful sort of poetic storytelling.

== Influences ==
- Robert Rauschenberg – Proto-Pop Painter
- Larry Rivers – Pop Painter
- Willem de Kooning – Abstract Expressionist Painter
- Ray Johnson – Proto-Pop Collagist and Mail Artist
- Charles Olson – Poet
- Joe Cardarelli – Beat Poet
- Anselm Hollo – Poet
- Arshile Gorky – Modernist Painter
- Cy Twombly – Abstract Expressionist Painter
