= Dawn-Michelle Baude =

American poet, journalist and educator

- Born: January 15, 1959 (age 67) Southern Illinois, United States
- Literary movement: Postmodernism

Dawn-Michelle Baude (born January 15, 1959) is an American poet, journalist and educator.

== Biography ==
Born in southern Illinois, Baude moved to San Diego, California, in 1977 with her first husband Angelo Kolokithas (divorced 1979). Baude received her undergraduate degree from San Diego State University. While pursuing her graduate degree at New College of California, she was influenced by Robert Duncan and other Bay Area writers active in the 1980s. She received her MA from New College in 1986. She earned an MFA from Mills College shortly thereafter.

In the late 1980s, she moved to Athens, Greece, then to Paris, France, where she married Laurent Baude (divorced 2008). Influenced by the poets Alice Notley and Douglas Oliver, she published poetry as well as art criticism. She was a frequent contributor to various Condé Nast and Meredith publications, appearing with the bylines Dawn Kolokithas and Dawn-Michelle Baude, as well as under pseudonyms.

In the 1990s, she lived in Egypt, Lebanon and France. She gave birth to her son, Alexandre, in 1996—the same year she received her Diplôme d'études approfondies from the Sorbonne. She joined the faculty of Bard College's Lacoste School of the Arts program in southern France, during which time she met poet Gustaf Sobin, artist Curt Asker, composer Anders Hillborg, writer David Ambrose, filmmaker Peter Montagnon and other habitués of the Provence region.

She has taught at the Université de Paris, the American University of Beirut, Alexandria University (Egypt), John Cabot University (Rome, Italy), and the American University of Paris. She earned her PhD in English from the University of Illinois at Chicago in 2003. In 2007, after 18 years abroad, she returned to the US to make her home in the state of New York. In 2011, Baude moved to Las Vegas, Nevada, where she blogs for the Las Vegas Weekly, Huffington Post, and others.

== Awards ==
- Tucson Festival of Books, First Place in Nonfiction, 2016
- Noepe Center for Literary Arts, Residency Scholarship, 2016
- Nevada Arts Council Artist Fellowship, Honorable Mention, 2016
- Senior Fulbright Award, 2005–06

== Works ==
=== Poetry ===
- Finally: A Calendar, Los Angeles, CA: Mindmade Books, 2009
- The Flying House, Anderson, SC: Free Verse/Parlor Press, 2008
- Through a Membrane / Clouds, Bainbridge Island, WA: g o n g press, 2006
- Egypt, Sausalito, CA: The Post-Apollo Press, 2003
- Sunday, Paris, France: Signum Editions, 2002
- The Beirut Poems, Austin, TX: Skanky Possum Editions, 2001
- Gaffiot Exquis, Paris, France: Arkadin Press, 1997
- Not Another Haiku, Berkeley, CA: Flit Publications, 1989
- Good Morning, Bob, Berkeley, CA: Flit Publications, 1985

=== Poetry translations ===
- A Vision of the Return by Amin Khan, Sausalito, CA: The Post-Apollo Press, 2012
- End Papers by Bernard Picasso, Pace Wildenstein Gallery, New York, NY, 1998

=== Editorial ===
- Van Gogh's Ear, an anthology of the arts, Paris, France: French Connection Press, 2009

=== Monographs and essays ===
- Beckmann Retrospective: A Survey of Past and Present Works, Henderson, NV: Smacksheets, 2013
- Everything is Perfect: The Art and Philosophy of Diego Jacobson, New York, NY: Ico Gallery, 2011
- reConnaître: Curt Asker, Paris, France: Réunion des Musées Nationaux, 2001
- Notes Toward a New Theory of Pasta, Berkeley, CA: Flit Publications, 1988

=== Communications ===
- The Executive Guide to E-mail Correspondence, New York, NY: Career Press, 2009/07
- The Everything Kids Learning French, New York, NY: Adams Media, 2008
- Savoir Dire Non (with Marie Haddou), Paris, France: Flammarion, 2005/1997
- The International Lawyer's Style Sheet, Paris, France: IBM EMEA, 2002

=== Nonfiction ===
- Lane Lines, A Sampler, Paris, France: Cahier d’Acropole, 1992
- Tropologue, Berkeley, CA: Poltroon Press, 1986
- Letter From Africa, Bolinas, CA: Evergreen Press, 1984

=== Fiction ===
- The Anatolian Tapestry, Berkeley, CA: Flit Publications, 1989
- A Week In The Life Of The Marines, America's Most Elite Fighting Team, Berkeley, CA: Transitional Face, 1988
