= Hasley =

Hasley is a surname. Notable people with the surname include:

- Fred Hasley (1884–1939), American typesetter and politician
- Louis Hasley (1906–1986), American professor, writer, poet, essayist, editor, and critic

== See also ==
- Halsey (surname)
