= Diane Ward =

American poet

Diane Ward (born November 9, 1956) is a U.S. poet initially associated with the first wave of Language poetry in the 1970s and has actively published into the 21st century, maintaining a presence in various artistic communities for many decades. Born in Washington, DC where she attended the Corcoran School of Art, Ward currently lives in Santa Monica, California where she taught poetry in public schools to 1st through 5th graders for many years.

Ward has published more than a dozen works of poetry and has been included in numerous anthologies, among them: Moving Borders and Out of Everywhere along with selections published in The Norton Anthology of Postmodern American Poetry and From the Other Side of the Century. She has read widely in the United States, including the District of Columbia Arts Center, Small Press Traffic at New College (San Francisco), The Bowery Poetry Club and The Poetry Project of St. Mark’s Church. Ward's work has appeared in dozens of small press publications, including: Crayon, Conjunctions, The Paris Review, Sulfur, and Raddle Moon.

Ward has received considerable recognition for her work including the California Arts Council Artists Fellowship in Literature, a National Endowment for the Arts Creative Writing Fellowship, and the San Francisco State University Poetry Center’s Book of the Year Award. Several of her poems (including “Fade on Family”) have been set to music by the Los Angeles composer Michael Webster and she has collaborated with the avant-garde sound performer and musician, Emily Hay.

== Selected bibliography ==
- On Duke Ellington’s Birthday (Washington, D.C.: self-published)
- Trop-i-dom (Washington, D.C.: Jawbone, 1977)
- The Light American (Washington, D.C.: Jawbone, 1979)
- Theory of Emotion (New York: Segue/O Press, 1979)
- Never without One (New York: Roof, 1984)
- Relation (New York: Roof, 1989)
- Human Ceiling (New York: Roof, 1995)
- Imaginary Movie (Elmwood, Connecticut: Potes & Poets Press, 1992)
- Exhibition (Elmwood, Connecticut: Potes & Poets Press, 1995)
- (contributor) Out of Everywhere: linguistically innovative poetry by women in North America & the UK, edited by Maggie O’Sullivan (London: Reality Street Editions, 1996)
- (contributor) Moving Borders: Three Decades of Innovative Writing by Women, edited by Mary Margaret Sloan (New Jersey: Talisman House, Publishers, 1998)
- Portraits and Maps (with art by Michael C. McMillen) (Piacenza, Italy: ML&NLF, 2000)
- Portrait As If Through My Own Voice (Studio City, California: Margin to Margin, 2001)
- When You Awake (New York: Portable Press at Yo-Yo Labs)
- Flim-Yoked Scrim (San Diego: Factory School, 2006)
- No List (No List) (Seeing Eye Books, 2008)
- Belladonna Elders Series No. 8: Jane Sprague / Tina Darragh / Diane Ward (Belladonna, 2009)

Further Reading

- "Ward on Seaton", L=A=N=G=U=A=G=E, Volume 3, Number 13 [December 1980] This is a review by Ward of Peter Seaton's "Piranesi Pointed Up". The review can be accessed online here
- Silliman, Ron (editor). In the American Tree. Orono, Maine: National Poetry Foundation, 1986; reprint ed. with a new afterword, 2002. This groundbreaking anthology of language poetry serves as a very useful primer and includes Ward's poem "Pronouncing"
