= Jeannine Savard =

American poet (born 1950)

Jeannine Savard (born 1950) is an American poet, born in the Adirondack Mountain Region of New York State. Her poems are lyrical and involve and reflect the lush region of the country, as well as the Sonoran Desert where she has lived since the 1980s as an Associate Professor of English at Arizona State University.

Savard's poems have appeared in Blackbird, The Fiddlehead, Superstition Review, Crab Orchard Review, Hayden’s Ferry Review, The Salt River Review, The Blue Guitar Magazine, and The Nashville Review.

== Published works ==
Savard has published several volumes of poetry, including:

- Accounted For (2011), Red Hen Press. ISBN 978-1-59709-489-4.
- Snow Water Cove (Reissue: 2006), A Carnegie Mellon Classic Contemporary, Carnegie Mellon University Press. ISBN 0-88748-455-7.
- My Hand Upon Your Name (2005), Red Hen Press. ISBN 1-59709-009-3.
- Snow Water Cove (1988), University of Utah Press. ISBN 0-87480-291-1.
- Trumpeter (1993), Carnegie Mellon University Press. ISBN 0-88748-153-1.
