= Joe Cardarelli =

American poet (1944-1994)

Joe Cardarelli (1944–1994) was a poet, painter, graduate of the Johns Hopkins Writing Seminars, and teacher of writing at the Maryland Institute College of Art for 27 years. Cardarelli pushed generations of MICA artists to incorporate writing into their creative repertoire, and regularly collaborated with his faculty colleagues on projects and performances. He is noted for establishing poetry series such as the Black Mountain poets, St. Valentine’s Day Poetry Marathon, and the Spectrum of Poetic Fire at MICA.

In his “Black Mountain Poets” series in 1983/84, he gathered material for a documentary video, Black Mountain Revisited — a historically invaluable collage of interviews and readings given by Robert Duncan, Robert Creeley, Edward Dorn, Joel Oppenheimer, and Jonathan Williams — in the case of Duncan and Oppenheimer, some of their last readings on record.

Known as the “Godfather of Baltimore Poetry,” he died at the age of 50 in 1994.

A poem that Joe contributed to Andrei Codrescu’s and Laura Rosenthal’s anthology American Poets Say Goodbye to the Twentieth Century (New York, 4 Walls 8 Windows, 1996) ends with the following lines:

It’s too bad sometimes I think
too bad we can’t see the air
too bad the air’s invisible
too bad the air’s not clearly there
say as it is with just a little smoke
we’d find ourselves new eyes
taken up by the shapes of air tides
the multi-layered, striated, tunneled
twisted rolling wave shaped
moving patterns the air makes
no more or less substantial
than one hundred or thousand years.

== Publications ==
- Phantom Pod, (Hollo, Joe Cardarelli, and Kirby Malone. Baltimore: Pod Books, 1977.)
- The Maine Book – Selected Poems
- Black Mountain revisited. Cardarelli, Joe; Skipper, Jim; Maryland Institute, College of Art, and Viridian Productions, producers. [Baltimore, Md.]: Viridian Productions of the Maryland Institute, College of Art; 1990. 1 videocassette (54 min.)
- KUMQUAT #3 (Hewitt, Geof, Editor, Enosburg Falls, VT: Kumquat Press, 1971. 52 pp.)
