= FrancEyE =

American poet (1922–2009)

- Born: Frances Dean Smith; March 19, 1922; San Rafael, California, U.S.
- Died: June 2, 2009 (aged 87); Greenbrae, California, U.S.
- Occupation: Poet
- Spouse: Wray Smith (? – 1960) (divorced)
- Partner: Charles Bukowski
- Children: 5

FrancEyE, also known as Frances Dean Smith (March 19, 1922 – June 2, 2009), was an American poet.

== Biography ==
Frances Dean Smith was born Frances Elizabeth Dean, in San Rafael, California, on March 19, 1922. During her childhood her family moved to the East Coast, where she grew up.

She married Wray Smith while living on the East Coast. They had four daughters, Patricia, Irene, Sara, and Ruth, and eventually divorced. Frances returned to California in 1963, leaving her daughters with their father.

She was closely associated with the Southern California poetry community. She is also noted for her relationship with poet Charles Bukowski, with whom she had her fifth daughter and his only child, Marina Louise Bukowski. Charles Bukowski wrote a poem about Frances which has been used as a eulogy, "One for Old Snaggle-Tooth" (1977).

Throughout her long career as a writer she never sought to capitalize on her connection to Bukowski and was revered as “The Bearded Witch of Santa Monica.” She died from complications of a hip fracture in Marin General Hospital in Greenbrae, California, early on June 2, 2009.

== Works ==
- Four Poets, (Ruth Wire, Grace Bogart, Joanne Stell, S.S.Veri), written under the pseudonym S.S. Veri
- Snaggletooth in Ocean Park, poems, 1996 (The Sacred Beverage Press)
- Amber Spider, poems, 2004 (Pearl Press)
- Grandma Stories, short stories (with drawings by Tim Donnelly), 2008
- Call, poems, 2009 (Rose of Sharon Press)

== Film appearances ==
- Bukowski: Born into This (2003), a documentary on Charles Bukowski.
- Graffiti Verité 6: "The Odyssey: Poets Passion & Poetry" (2006)

== See also ==
- List of people from Los Angeles
- List of poets from the United States
- List of short story writers
- Lists of women writers
