= Noah Falck =

American poet

- Born: April 23, 1977 (age 49); Dayton, Ohio, U.S.
- Education: BS, University of Dayton, MS, University of Dayton
- Occupations: Teacher, education director
- Spouse: Sherri Falck
- Writing career
- Genre: Poetry
- Notable awards: Judson Jerome Poetry Prize; 2003; Open Thread Chapbook Award; 2009; Paul Laurence Dunbar Poetry Prize; 2010; James Tate Poetry Prize; 2022

Noah Falck (born April 23, 1977) is an American poet, teacher, arts nonprofit executive, and culture worker.

== Life and work ==
=== Poetry and Editing ===
Falck is the author of the poetry collections Exclusions (Tupelo Press, 2020), a finalist for the 2020 Believer Book Award, and Snowmen Losing Weight (BatCat Press, 2012) as well as several chapbooks including the co-written collection, Prerecorded Weather (SurVision Books, 2022), winner of the James Tate Poetry Prize. His work has appeared in Boston Review, Kenyon Review, Harvard Review, Conduit, Ploughshares, The Slowdown, and Poets.org.

Falck has described his evolution as a poet as proceeding from an interest in narrative and world toward an interest in compression, voice, and "astonishment." Literary critics and scholars have associated Falck's more recent work with a "poetics of bewilderment" first articulated by the poet Fanny Howe in 1999, a practice "that often emulates the subconscious" by "relinquishing control." "Really with all of the Exclusion poems it was about setting a certain mood against the subjects and surrounding them with obscurity," Falck noted in a commentary on his poem "Poem Excluding Romance" in Winter Tangerine.

His credits as editor include My Next Heart: New Buffalo Poetry (BlazeVOX Books, 2017) and Silo City Reading Series: Ten Years of Poems in Grain Silos (Just Buffalo, 2022).

=== Just Buffalo Literary Center ===
Born and raised in Dayton, Ohio, Falck worked as a teacher before moving to Buffalo, New York to serve as Education Director at Just Buffalo Literary Center, the premier center for the literary arts in the Buffalo/Niagara region. After a decade at the organization, he took on the newly created role of Literary Director, "a unique position with a wide spectrum of responsibilities ... part education, part programming, part community engagement, part curation."

=== Silo City Reading Series ===
In 2013, Falck founded the Silo City Reading Series, a multimedia poetry event series inside a 120-foot high, 100-year-old abandoned grain elevator in Buffalo. The first event featured the poet Joe Hall, the klezmer band Ahavaraba, and the photographer Thomas Bittner. Falck recalled the first Silo reading:

It was a little art party, which is to me what a reading should be—it should be a party. I'm always interested in inviting new people into the scene and inviting them to experience a poem, and a lot of readings don't feel like that. They feel stiff, like some people aren't smart enough to engage with poetry, or won't get it. I think having the music and art elements are a way of inviting different communities in, saying, this is all poetry as well. That was some of the idea behind the silos. And the space is a poem too.

The series continues today under the auspices of Just Buffalo. Readers and performers have included Ocean Vuong, Jericho Brown, Hanif Abdurraqib, Roger Reeves, Solmaz Sharif, Megan Fernandes, Morgan Parker, Maggie Smith, Julie Byrne, Sun June, Wild Pink, Edreys Wajed, Ariel Aberg-Riger, Chuck Tingley, and many others. The series has earned national praise for Falck's curation and for the inspired setting in Silo City. Poet Phil Metres described the complex as “the gentle ghost-grain future rising out of the rude concrete brutalism of the past.” Falck told Fear No Lit:

Originally, I think we just wanted to read poems in a cool place, along the river around these beautiful, decaying structures. But as the series developed we knew there was an opportunity to highlight not only the industrial past of Buffalo, but also a chance to showcase the Buffalo arts community in an unusual space.There is a 7-second natural reverb inside the Marine A grain silo. The sound of a poet’s voice echoing throughout plays a major role in the tone of the event. As a reader you really have to slow down and focus on your words, your delivery. And the same goes for anyone attending an event. If you don't pay attention, you might miss something.The silos capture both the history of the city and the architectural innovation. So, to invite the most exciting poets and artists into these spaces to feature their work seems like a gift. It has also been a way for us to share the experience of Buffalo with these visiting poets – so when they go back home, whether it be New York or LA or Boston they will hopefully think back on Buffalo with a sense of awe.

=== Buffalo Correspondance School ===
Buffalo Correspondance School officially began in summer 2024 as a" collaborative mail art project between Ariel Aberg-Riger and Noah Falck. BCS is not a circle, a rhombus, a drawing, a poem, or a door. It is a river becoming a lake." Falck and Aberg-Riger described the project as a natural outgrowth of the Silo City Summer Reading Series, where Falck had selected Aber-Riger as a featured artist. "Three days after the silos I had to abruptly move across the country to California, and it felt like we were mid-sentence, creatively. We had so enjoyed making things together, and I wanted to just keep making things with him. I knew we both loved Ray Johnson and mail art so I sent him a small pile of drawings and found photos and wrote 'Welcome to the Buffalo Correspondance School. Please add to and respond.' And he did. And then I did. And we just kept going," Aberg-Riger told Buffalo Hive.

In October 2025, Buffalo Correspondance School mounted its first public event, Fatigue Performance, at the Burchfield-Penney Art Center in Buffalo. With help from a New York State Council on the Arts grant for a poetry collection in progress titled Fatigue Performance, Falck enlisted Aberg-Riger, musician Kevin Cain, and the band Plant Water to put the poems to music, turning it into "an immersive experiential event blending poetry, music, and art." The public event marked the release of a lathe-cut vinyl record featuring poems by Falck, music by plant water, and design by Aberg-Riger.

== Bibliography ==
- Prerecorded Weather (with Matt McBride; SurVision Books, 2022)
- Exclusions (Tupelo Press, 2020)
- My Next Heart: New Buffalo Poetry, ed. (BlazeVOX Books, 2017)
- You Are In Nearly Every Future (Dostoyevsky Wannabe x, 2017)
- Celebrity Dream Poems (Poor Claudia, 2013)
- Snowmen Losing Weight (BatCat Press, 2012) ISBN 978-0-9843678-6-3
- Life As A Crossword Puzzle (Open Thread, 2009)
- Measuring Tape For The Midwest (Pavement Saw, 2008)
- Homemade Engines From A Dream (Pudding House Publications, 2007)
