= Judson Crews =

American poet

- Born: June 30, 1917; Waco, Texas, U.S.
- Died: May 17, 2010 (aged 92); Taos, New Mexico, U.S.
- Education: Baylor University (BA, MA)
- Occupations: Poet; bookseller; publisher; educator
- Writing career
- Years active: 1946 – 2010

Judson Crews (June 30, 1917 – May 17, 2010) was an American poet, bookseller and small press publisher.

== Early life ==
Crews was born and raised in Waco, Texas. Crews earned a Bachelor of Arts and Master of Arts in sociology from Baylor University. He also did postgraduate work at the University of Texas at El Paso.

== Career ==
Crews worked as an educator at the Wharton County Junior College and the University of New Mexico branch campus in Gallup, New Mexico.

He first opened his Motive Bookshop and issued his first Motive Press publications in Waco. In 1947 he moved both businesses to Taos, New Mexico, and married Taos photographer Mildred Tolbert. In addition to writing poetry, his activities in Taos over several decades included editing the poetry magazines Suck-egg Mule, The Deer and Dachshund, The Flying Fish, Motive, Vers Libre, Poetry Taos and The Naked Ear (which published poetry by Robert Creeley, Charles Bukowski, Kenneth L. Beaudoin, Stuart Z. Perkoff, Vincent Ferrini, Larry Eigner, LeRoi Jones (Amiri Baraka), Jack Anderson and Diane Di Prima, among others); and issuing chapbooks of his own poetry and poetry by his friends Wendell Anderson and Carol Bergé. Crews was a frequent contributor to Poetry, among many other literary journals. Besides operating his bookshop and press, he worked in newspaper production, as a teacher (including as a lecturer at the University of Zambia, 1974–1978), and as a social worker and counselor, until his retirement.

Crews wrote and published under a number of pseudonyms, including Cerise Farallon, Willard Emory Betis, Trumbull Drachler, Tobi Macadams and Charley John Greasybear. Although he denied it, many in his literary circle believe that "Mason Jordan Mason"—a widely published and anthologized African American poet of the 1950s and 60s, recognized by the likes of Amiri Baraka (LeRoi Jones) and Langston Hughes—was another of Crews's carefully constructed literary personae.

Crews was a friend of novelist Henry Miller, and the two briefly lived together in Big Sur. Crews was a lifelong activist against censorship in publishing.

Much of his own output as an independent, small press publisher consisted of short-run, inexpensively produced literary chapbooks and magazines, making him a notable figure in the 1960s-70s movement known as the Mimeo Revolution.

== Personal life ==
He died on May 17, 2010, in Taos, New Mexico, and is buried in Tres Orejas. Crews had two daughters, artist and author Carole Crews, and photographer Anna Bush Crews.

== Bibliography ==
- The Southern Temper (Waco, TX, 1946)
- No is the Night (Taos, NM, 1949)
- Patrocinio Barela, Taos Wood Carver (with Wendell B. Anderson and Mildred Crews, Taos, NM, 1955)
- Inwade to Briney Garth (Taos, NM, 1960)
- A Unicorn When Needs Be (Taos, NM, 1963)
- Selected Poems (Cleveland, OH, 1964)
- Three on a Match (with Wendell B. Anderson and "Cerise Farallon," Taos, NM, 1966)
- Nolo Contendere (Houston, TX, 1978)
- Songs (as "Charley John Greasybear," Boise, ID, 1979
- The Noose, A Retrospective: 4 Decades (Duende/Tooth of Time, Placitas, NM, 1980)
- The Clock of Moss (Boise, ID, 1983)
- Against All Wounds (Parkdale, OR, 1987)
- Dolores Herrera/Nations and Peoples (Las Cruces, NM, 1991)
- The Brave Wild Coast: A Year with Henry Miller (Los Angeles, 1997) This autobiographic narrative takes us from the fleshpots of LA bussing to bleak cliffsides over a raging ocean.
