= Mary Koncel =

American poet

Mary Koncel is an American poet who has published three books of poetry. She is known for writing prose poetry.

== Biography ==
Koncel was born and raised in Chicago and holds a BFA in Poetry from Columbia College Chicago and MFA in English from MFA Program for Poets & Writers at the University of Massachusetts Amherst. She lives in Worthington, Massachusetts. Koncel teaches writing at Smith College, and is a writing consultant to Boston's Department of Public Health in the AIDS Bureau. Koncel is known for prose poetry that is a combination of humor and visual images.

Koncel is also involved with the American Wild Horse Campaign, a group that finds homes for horses and burros on public lands in the United States.

== Grants and awards ==
- 1996 - Poetry Grant, Massachusetts Cultural Council
- Finalist, the Norma Farber First Book Award

== Bibliography ==
=== Books ===
- Closer to the Day (1999) - Quale Press
- You Can Tell The Horse Anything
- The Last Blonde - Hedgerow Books (2017)

=== Anthologies ===
- The Party Train: A Collection of North American Prose Poetry
- No Boundaries: Prose Poems by 24 American Poets (edited by Ray Gonzalez)
- The Best of the Prose Poem: An International Journal
- Real Things: An Anthology of Popular Culture in American Poetry
- Ladies, Start Your Engines: Women Writing on Cars and on the Road

=== Journal publications ===
- The Massachusetts Review
- The Journal
- The Illinois Review
- key satch(el)
- Denver Quarterly
- The Prose Poem: An International Journal
