= Ray Fitzgerald (poet) =

American cowboy poet

Ray Fitzgerald is an American cowboy poet who was born in Prineville, Oregon.
