= Donna Marie Merritt =

American poet and children's author (born 1965)

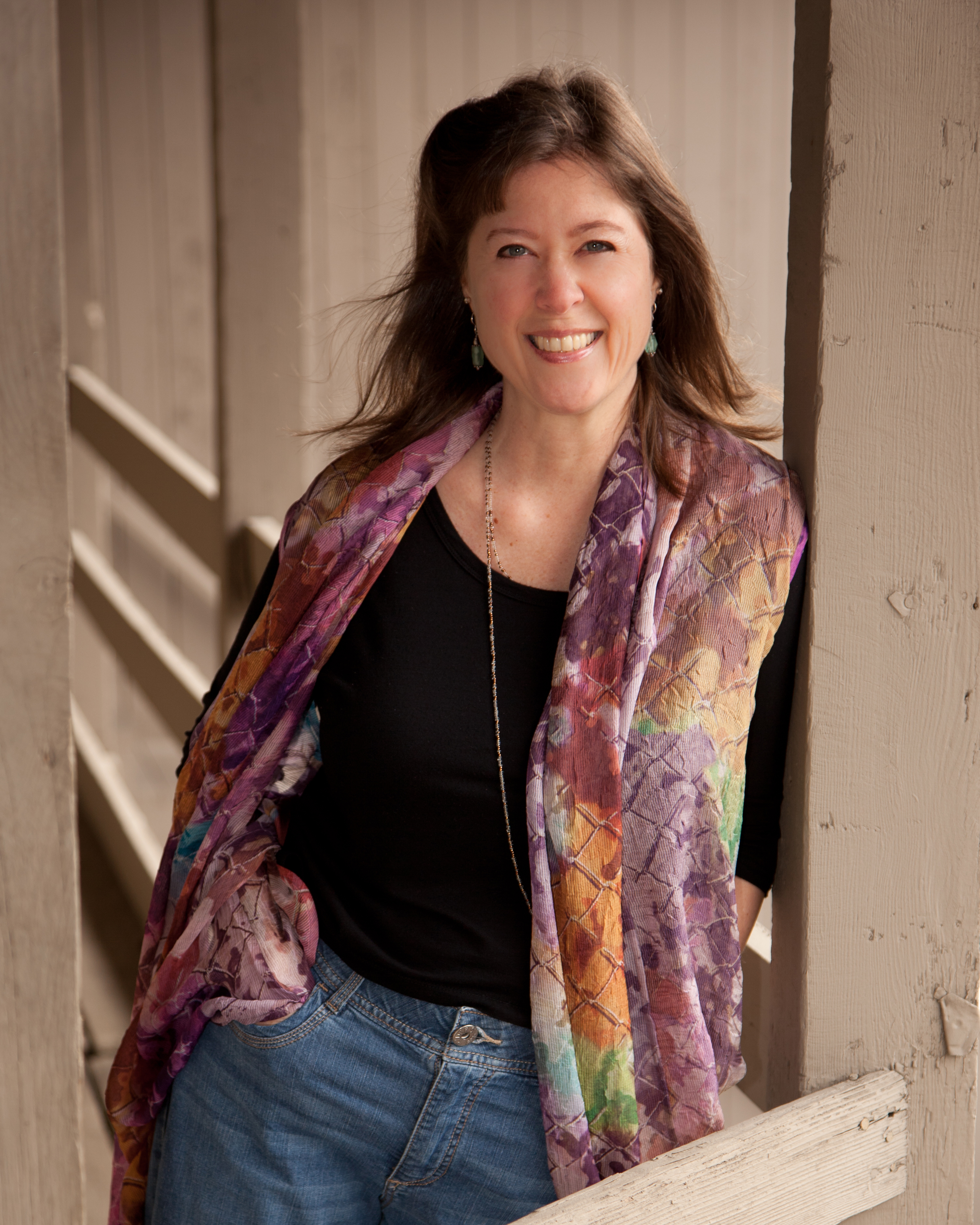
Donna Marie Merritt

Donna Marie Merritt (born 1965) is an American poet and children's author. Writing about such topics as unemployment and cancer, her poetry has been described as “the real thing, [a] moving human experience artfully expressed” by poet Dave Morrison. Merritt's collections contain serious and humorous poems, and the poetic forms range from traditional verse to free verse to haiku.

== Personal life ==
Merritt was born in Rome, NY, on January 6, 1965, spent much of her childhood in Texas, and moved to Connecticut when in high school. Merritt earned an A.S. in Early Childhood Education from Mattatuck Community College, a B.S. in Elementary Education from Central Connecticut State University (graduating first in her class), and an M.S. in Psychology from Central Connecticut State University (with a 4.0 GPA).

Donna Marie Merritt (maiden name: Mulcahy) has also written under the name Donna Pitino and a variety of pseudonyms. She lives with husband Stew Merritt; they have three children and three grandchildren.

== Career ==
Donna Marie Merritt spent 15 years as an elementary and middle school teacher before devoting her time to writing and working as a librarian. Her first children's book, Let's Eat!, was published by Abrams Learning Trends in 2004. Her contributions to the Big Book Math™ and Big Book Science™ series won the Teachers’ Choice Award from Learning Magazine in 2007 and 2009. Her book Too-Tall Tina was part of the Math Matters® series from Kane Press that won Learning's Teachers’ Choice Award for Children's Books in 2008.

Merritt's newest poetry book, Bible Poems for Reflection and Response, was published in 2020 by Cladach Publishing. It covers every book in the Bible, both Old and New Testaments.

Her No Winter Maintenance: Pass at Your Own Risk (2017). is"Both wise and wickedly funny," according to poet George Bilgere.

We Walk Together was published in 2015 by Beech Hill Publishing Company Poet. Barbara Crooker says, "Merritt's is a plain undecorated style, bearing witness to our troubled world."

Her House and Other Poems was released by Stairwell Books in June 2013. About this book, poet and novelist David Kherdian says, "Here we have an eye open to the world, that poem by poem brings that world into view for all to see, and to be nurtured by."

Merritt's earlier poetry collections, What's Wrong with Ordinary? Poems to Celebrate Life (2012), Cancer, A Caregiver's View (2011), and Job Loss, A Journey in Poetry (2010), have an intimate way of connecting with readers. Noted poet and anthologist Lee Bennett Hopkins says, "Merritt's poignant work resonates with true realities, giving reasons to see ourselves as we should."

== Awards ==
Teachers’ Choice Award from Learning Magazine for contributions to three children's book series, 2007, 2008, 2009

Award for Young Adult Fiction from Children's Writer, 2005

Award for Poetry in Dimensions, First Place, 1984

== Published work ==
Poetry books

Bible Poems for Reflection and Response, Cladach Publishing, Greeley, CO; 2020 (9781945099250)

No Winter Maintenance: Pass at Your Own Risk, YBK Publishers, New York, NY; 2017 (9781936411481)

We Walk Together, BEECH HILL PUBLISHING COMPANY, Maine; 2015 (9780990820062)

Her House and Other Poems, STAIRWELL BOOKS, Norwalk, CT and the UK; 2013 (9781939269089)

What's Wrong with Ordinary? Poems to Celebrate Life, AVALON PRESS, Cornwall, England; 2012 (9780956330345)

Cancer, A Caregiver's View, AVALON PRESS, Cornwall, England; 2011 (9780956330338)

Job Loss, A Journey in Poetry, AVALON PRESS, Cornwall, England; 2010 (9780956330314)

Poems for children and adults

"St. Patrick's Day in Chicago": poem for anthology—THE POETRY OF US; National Geographic; 2018

"Me and My Feet": children's poem for anthology—ONE MINUTE TILL BEDTIME; Little, Brown Books for Young Readers; Spring 2016

"The Great Blue Hole": poem for anthology—BOOK OF NATURE POETRY; National Geographic; October 2015

"Be Still": poem for GARBANZO LITERARY JOURNAL, volume 5; May 2015

"Playful Puppies": children's poem; HIGHLIGHTS HELLO! Magazine; 2014

"I Can!" and "Your Wonderful Body": children's poems; HIGHLIGHTS HELLO! Magazine; 2013

"Jargon" and "Snow Walk": poems for CADUCEUS, a journal by the Yale Medical Group, volumes 9 and 10; Spring 2012 and 2013

“Hello, World!”: children's poem; HIGHLIGHTS HIGH FIVE Magazine; 2012

"Easiest Job Ever": children's poem; SCBWI BULLETIN; 2012

"In Response to Olives": poem for anthology—OLIVES, NOW AND THEN: POEMS IN HONOR OF DONALD HALL; CT Poetry Society; Sept. 2011

“me and lee”: poem for anthology—DEAR ONE: A TRIBUTE TO LEE BENNETT HOPKINS; NCTE; 2009

“The Open Door”: poem for all ages; BOOK LINKS; May 2009

Poems for QUEUE, INC (language arts and writing workbooks): “Traveling Together”; “Who Needs School?”; “Different”; “The Turtle's Walk”; “Someone Special”; “Jumping Rope”; 2009

“Learning to Follow Christ”: Christian poem; THE CATHOLIC LEADER; 2008

“I Gave to You”: Christian poem; THE CATHOLIC YEARBOOK; January 2008

“Promises”: Christian poem; THE CATHOLIC LEADER; 2007 and THE CATHOLIC YEARBOOK; 2009

“Voluntary Lockdown”: poem for writers; Society of Children's Book Writers and Illustrators BULLETIN; 2007

“Teaching Your Parents to Be Polite”: children's poem; WEE ONES Online; 2003

“Re: Education Cuts”: town budget; TOWN TIMES; July 2000

Poems published by CAROLYN’S VOICE (pro-life newsletter): “Because of You” (2011);“The Decision” (2009); “Thank You” (2005); “Where, Lord?” (2005); “My Right to Be Loved” (2004); “God's Gift” (2004); “My Child” (2003); “Precious Child So New” (2002); “I Am a Child of God” (2001); “A Stirring Within” (2000)

“The Unpublished Writer”: for writers; SCBWI NEW ENGLAND NEWS; Nov. 1997

Children's books

Teensy Meensy Mice by Donna Marie Merritt, illustrated by Ed Heck; coming in 2018

Hush That Hullabaloo! by Donna Marie Merritt, illustrated by Chris Demarest; 2017 (9781365516221)

Amazing Scientists, gr. 1–2 science book; Abrams Learning Trends, Austin; 2006 (9780766420571)

The Water Cycle, gr. 1–2 science book; Abrams Learning Trends, Austin; 2006 (9780766420649)

Too-Tall Tina, K–3 Math Matters series; Kane Press, New York; 2005 (9781575651507)

How Else Can You Show It?, K–1 math book; Abrams Learning Trends, Austin; 2005 (9780766418318)

How Scientists Observe, K–1 science; Abrams Learning Trends, Austin; 2005 (pen name: Marie Mulcahy) (9780766415836)

Are They Equal? K–1 math book; Abrams Learning Trends, Austin; 2005 (pen name: Brianna M. Cain) (9780766418332)

Is It Likely to Happen? K–1 math book; Abrams Learning Trends, Austin; 2005 (9780766418349)

Let's Figure It Out! K–1 math book; Abrams Learning Trends, Austin; 2005 (9780766418356)

Let's Measure with Tools, K–1 math book; Abrams Learning Trends, Austin; 2005 (pen name: Christine N. Casteel) (9780766418363)

My Wonderful Body, K–1 science book; Abrams Learning Trends, Austin; 2005 (9780766415843)

Over, Under, In, and Out, K–1 math book; Abrams Learning Trends, Austin; 2005 (pen name: Marie Mulcahy) (9780766418370)

Playground Science, K–1 science book; Abrams Learning Trends, Austin; 2005 (9780766415850)

Sun and Shadows, Sky and Space, K–1 science; Abrams Learning Trends, Austin; 2005 (9780766415874)

What Time Is It? K–1 math book; Abrams Learning Trends, Austin; 2005 (pen name: Marie Mulcahy) (9780766418394)

Let's Eat! pre-K and K science book; Abrams Learning Trends, Austin; 2004 (9780766415003)

Teachers’ guides

Big Book Science™: 18 pre-K to grade 2 teacher's guides; Abrams Learning Trends; 2004, 2005

Big Book Math™: 20 pre-K to grade 1 teacher's guides; Abrams Learning Trends; 2003, 2005

Columns

“The Parent Connection”: monthly column for parents; TEACHING K-8 Magazine; August 2003 to May 2004

“Life in the Middle”: monthly column for educators; TEACHING K-8 Magazine; September 2002 to May 2003

Comprehensive readiness program

Let's Begin with the Letter People: contributing writer to thematically-based preschool program; Abrams Learning Trends; 2009

Language arts instruction books

Explore Writing: poetry contributor and editor of revised tutorials for student preparation in writing assessment, grades 3 to 8; QUEUE, INC.; 2009

Explore Language Arts Literacy: poetry contributor and editor of revised tutorials for student preparation in language arts assessment, grades 3 to 8; QUEUE, INC.; 2009

Nonfiction articles for children

“The Great Ape Language Debate”; NATIONAL READING STYLES INSTITUTE; includes audiotape; 2005

“Homebots”; NATIONAL READING STYLES INSTITUTE; includes audiotape; 2005

Fiction stories for children

“Three Reasons”: online reading program, high school; TOTAL READER; 2005

“Sarah and the Rodeo Rider”: online reading program, high school; TOTAL READER; 2005

“Leo's Escape”: online reading program, grade 5; TOTAL READER; 2005

“Mike's Broken Arm”: online reading program, grade 3; TOTAL READER; 2005

Four stories for the Power Reading series, grade 4; NATIONAL READING STYLES INSTITUTE; includes audiotape; 2005

Five stories for the Power Reading series, grade 2; NATIONAL READING STYLES INSTITUTE; includes audiotape; 2004

“Is Lisa a Goody-Goody?”: Christian fiction for middle grade readers; DISCOVERY TRAILS; February 2003

Reflection/essay for adults

“Moments Unseen”: Christian reflection; SIGNS OF THE TIMES; April 2006

“God's Loving Plan”: Christian reflection; THE WORD AMONG US; Nov. 2004

“God's Voice in My Heart”: Christian reflection; SIGNS OF THE TIMES; Jan. 2004

“The Difficult Mrs. D.”: Christian reflection; LIGUORIAN; September 2003

“My Angels”: Christian reflection for parents; CATHOLIC TRANSCRIPT; July 2003

“Butterflies and Children”: reflection for parents; LAUGHING & LEARNING (anthology), 2003

Articles for educators, writers, and parents

"Twisting Paths": for writers; CAREER PLANNING & ADULT DEVELOPMENT JOURNAL; 2012

"Sapling": for writers; Black Lawrence Press; October 2011

“Healing through Writing”: for educators; NEA TODAY; October 2004

“Real Writers Write from the Heart”: for writers; CHILDREN’S WRITER; April 2004

“Why Do You Write?”: for young writers; POTLUCK MAGAZINE; March 2004

“Signs of Learning”: for educators; TEACHING K-8 Magazine; October 2002

“Smart Steps to School Success”: for parents; PARTNERSHIP FOR LEARNING; online September 2002

“A Parent's Bill of Rights”: for parents; PARTNERSHIP FOR LEARNING; online September 2002; reprinted by METRO PARENT Magazine; February 2004

“Writing Poetry for Children: A Joyful Struggle”: for writers; CHILDREN’S WRITER; January 2002

“Helping Parents to Help You”: for educators; TEACHING K-8 Magazine; September 2001

“Advice to a New Writer from a New Writer”: for writers; SCBWI: NEW ENGLAND NEWS; Sept./Oct. 1996
