= Max Finstein =

American poet

Max Finstein (1924–1982) was an American poet.

Finstein was born in Boston, Massachusetts. After serving in the military during World War II, he attended Black Mountain College. He spent time in New York and San Francisco, becoming friends with poets Allen Ginsberg, LeRoi Jones (Amiri Baraka) and Joel Oppenheimer, among others. He traveled to New Mexico for the first time in the 1950s to visit his long-time friend Robert Creeley, and moved there not long after. He lived in Taos and Santa Fe, NM, on and off for the rest of his life. Much of his poetry, inspired by the landscape of the American Southwest, was influenced by both the Black Mountain poets and the poets of the Beat Generation.

In 1967 Finstein co-founded New Buffalo, a hippie commune in Taos. He left New Buffalo in 1969 to found a second commune, the Reality Construction Company, also in Taos.

Finstein died of injuries suffered when his truck crashed during a snowstorm near Tonopah, NV, on his way to San Francisco, in March 1982.

The "Max," a trophy presented annually from 1982 to 2002 to winners of the Taos Poetry Circus World Heavyweight Championship Poetry Bout, was named in his honor.

== Works ==
Savonarola's Tune (Laurence Hellenberg, New York, 1959)
The Disappearance of Mountains: Poems 1960–63 (Wild Dog Books, San Francisco, 1966)
There's Always a Moon in America (Cranium Press, San Francisco, 1968)
Selected Poems (Desert Review Press, Santa Fe, 1980)
