= Jonathan Williams (poet) =

American poet (1929–2008)

- Jonathan Williams in 1985
- Born: March 8, 1929; Asheville, North Carolina
- Died: March 16, 2008 (aged 79); Highlands, North Carolina
- Education: St. Albans School, Princeton University, Chicago Institute of Design, Black Mountain College
- Occupations: Poet and publisher
- Known for: The Jargon Society press
- Partner: Thomas Meyer

Jonathan Williams (March 8, 1929 – March 16, 2008) was an American poet, publisher, essayist, and photographer. He is known as the founder of The Jargon Society, which has published poetry, experimental fiction, photography, and folk art since 1951.

== Overview ==
Williams was born in Asheville, North Carolina, to Thomas Benjamin and Georgette Williams, and raised in Washington, D.C. He attended St. Albans School in Washington, and then Princeton University, before dropping out to pursue the arts. Williams studied painting with Karl Knaths at the Phillips Gallery in Washington, D.C., and engraving and graphic arts with Stanley William Hayter at Atelier 17 in New York, followed by a semester at the Chicago Institute of Design. In 1951, he arrived at Black Mountain College to study photography with Harry Callahan and Aaron Siskind. At Black Mountain College, Williams met and was influenced by the college's rector, Charles Olson.

Also in 1951, Williams founded Jargon Books (later The Jargon Society) together with David Ruff, with the goal of publishing obscure writers. Based in Scaly Mountain, North Carolina, as well as the Yorkshire Dales in England, Jargon was long associated with the Black Mountain Poets. The press has published work by Charles Olson, Paul Metcalf, Lorine Niedecker, Lou Harrison, Mina Loy, Joel Oppenheimer, Ronald Johnson, James Broughton, Alfred Starr Hamilton and many other works by the American and British avant-garde. Since Williams' death, The Jargon Society has continued publication through the Black Mountain College Museum + Arts Center.

Once described as "a busy gadfly who happened somehow to pitch on a slope in western North Carolina," Williams was a living link between the experimental poets of Modernism's "second wave" and the unknown vernacular artists of Appalachia. Guy Davenport likened Williams' use of "found language" to the use of "found footage" by avant-garde filmmakers, as well as describing Williams as a species of cultural anthropologist. Williams for his part explained the fascination of such material in plainer terms:

Well, as you know, a lot of my poetry is found and that's, I think, because I think I'm quite a good listener and I'm willing to lay back and listen, and I think it's something do with living in the country. I mean, this place, Skywinding Farm, there are times when Tom Meyer and I will only see somebody from the outside world once or twice a week. And we've known each other so long that we don't talk as much as we might. Tom can talk up a storm, He's up there in the Duncan/Olson class. So I like to listen and I like to hear things, so if you listen carefully then you do find things. I do it all the time. I mean, you know the early book, Blues and Roots, which was done in the course of walking a big piece of the Appalachian Trail, I listened to mountain people for over a thousand miles and I really heard some amazing stuff. And I left it pretty much as I heard it. I didn't have to do anything but organize a little bit, crystallize it, you know. That's the thing I love about found material, you wake it up, you "make" it into something.

The literary critic Hugh Kenner described Williams as the "truffle hound of American poetry."

Williams was also a longtime contributing editor of the photography journal Aperture.

Williams divided his time between Corn Close at Dentdale in England and Scaly Mountain, North Carolina. He died March 16, 2008, in Highlands, North Carolina, from pneumonia. He was survived by his longtime partner, Thomas Meyer.

== Selected bibliography ==
- An Ear in Bartram's Tree: Selected Poems 1957-1967 (Chapel Hill, University of North Carolina Press, 1969; New Directions, 1972).
- Mahler (Grossman/Cape Goliard Press, 1969).
- The Loco Logodaedalist in Situ: Selected Poems 1968-70 (Cape Goliard Press, 1971).
- Elite/Elate Poems: Selected Poems 1971-75 (Jargon Society, 1979).
- I Shall Save One Land Unvisited: 11 Southern Photographers. Jonathan Williams and Ray Kass, with contributions by James Baker Hall. Gnomon Press, 1978. Paperback, 94 pages. ISBN ISBN 0917788141.
- The Magpie's Bagpipe: Selected Essays (North Point Press, 1982).
- Blues & Roots/Rue & Bluets: A Garland for the Southern Appalachians, revised edition (Duke University Press, 1985).
- Blackbird Dust: Essays, Poems and Photographs (Turtle Point Press, 2000).
- Jubilant Thicket: New and Selected Poems (Copper Canyon Press, 2005)
