= Phebe Cobb Larry Dole =

American poet (1835–1909)

- Born: Phebe Cobb Larry; November 28, 1835; Gorham, Maine, U.S.
- Died: April 26, 1909 (aged 73)
- Resting place: Chase Cemetery, Windham, Maine, U.S.
- Education: Gorham Female Seminary
- Occupation: Poet
- Spouse: Samuel T. Dole (m. 1853)
- Children: 2
- Parent(s): Joseph C. Larry; Mary Purinton

Phebe Cobb Larry Dole (November 28, 1835 – April 26, 1909) was an American poet.

== Early life ==
Phebe Cobb Larry was born in Gorham, Maine, on November 28, 1835. Her great-grandfather, Dennis Larry, came from Ireland to the United States with the British army during the French and Indian war, and afterwards settled on land granted him in Gorham for services rendered during the war. Her mother, Mary Purinton, was the great-granddaughter of Ezra Brown, one of the early settlers of Windham, Maine, who was killed by the Indian chief, Poland, during the last battle between the inhabitants of Windham and the Indians, on May 14, 1756. Her father, Joseph C. Larry, was a blacksmith and farmer, and resided in Windham.

Her early life was quiet and simple. She was educated in the common schools of her own town and in Gorham Female Seminary.

== Career ==
Some of her early poetical productions fell into the hands of a well-known critic and scholar, who secured their publication in several Maine papers, much to the surprise of their youthful author.

In 1860 Dole began to write for the Portland Transcript, the Kennebec Journal, Hallowell Gazette and other Maine papers. John Neal and Edward H. Elwell gave her much encouragement. Dole wrote for many of the leading magazines and acquired a wide reputation outside of her own State.

In the late 19th century she became the editor-inchief of the Narragansett Sun, a weekly paper published in Portland.

As an artist she claimed to be but an amateur, but her paintings showed the taste and fine feeling of the poet. She produced landscapes which received special mention.

She was featured in Griffith's Poets of Maine and Moulton's A Woman of the Century.

== Personal life ==
On May 1, 1853, Phebe Cobb Larry married Samuel T. Dole (January 17, 1831 - April 1, 1912), of Windham, a man of fine literary taste and good business capacity.

The Doles had two children, William B. and George H. (May 1, 1856 – September 2, 1864). William B. Dole (April 23, 1854 - January 4, 1887) married Mary E. Brown, of Gorham, on May 15, 1874, and their only child, Frederick H. (born July 15, 1875) attended Bowdoin College.

She died on April 26, 1909, and is buried at Chase Cemetery, Windham, Maine.
