= Lily Augusta Long =

American poet and novelist

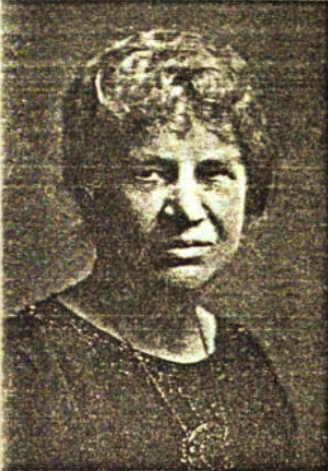
- Lily A. Long in a 1924 publication.
- Born: 1862; St. Paul, Minnesota
- Died: 1927 (aged 64–65); St. Paul, Minnesota
- Occupations: Poet, novelist

Lily Augusta Long (1862 - 1927) was an American poet and novelist.

== Early life ==
Long was born in 1862 in St. Paul, Minnesota. She decided to become a writer when she was 11 years old while her family was living in Oregon. After moving back to St. Paul with her parents, she graduated high school and later took an elective course at the University of Wisconsin. As a student, she submitted verses and sketches to local papers. A few of her poems were published in Unity. In 1887, two of her stories appeared in the magazine Overland and Current. Long edited and contributed to Women's Record.

== Career ==
Long wrote short stories and poems for Harper's Weekly. Under the pseudonym Roman Doubleday, she wrote pulp mysteries for The Popular Magazine and novels. In a review from The Brooklyn Daily Eagle of The Hemlock Avenue Mystery, F. Dana Reid wrote, "Roman Doubleday's new story, The Hemlock Avenue Mystery presents and excellent example of a skillfully constructed mystery romance, where the denouement is so successfully concealed that the reader will have no solution of the puzzle before the time arrives for the revealing flash of the limelight". A review in The Boston Globe said, "Roman Doubleday has the ability to crate character, a talent that adds greatly to this kind of fiction".

== Death ==
Long died on September 8, 1927, in St. Paul.
