= Lee Passarella =

American poet

Lee Passarella is a writer and senior literary editor of the Atlanta Review. His long narrative poem Swallowed Up In Victory (Burd Street Press, 2002) is based on the American Civil War.

== Works ==
- Swallowed Up in Victory: A Civil War Narrative, Petersburg, 1864-1865. Burd Street Pr (2002). ISBN 1-57249-301-1.
- The Geometry of Loneliness, WordTech Communications (2006). ISBN 1-933456-39-6.
