= Ernest Matthew Mickler =

American food writer (1940–1988)

Ernest Matthew Mickler (Pronounced MYkler) (August 23, 1940 – November 15, 1988) was the author of White Trash Cooking, a cookbook with recipes from the American Southeast.

Mickler grew up in rural Florida. Mickler also wrote Sinkin Spells, Hot Flashes, Fits and Cravins, now sold as White Trash Cooking II. He died of AIDS in 1988, aged 48.
