= Shawn Sturgeon =

Shawn Sturgeon (born 1965) is a poet and professor. He was educated at the University of Nebraska–Lincoln and did postgraduate work in English at the University of North Texas (MA) and the University of Cincinnati (PhD).

His first collection of poems, Either/Ur, was called a "remarkable poetry collection" in The Antioch Review. It was a finalist for the Paris Review Prize (2000) and a semi-finalist for the Academy of American Poets/Walt Whitman Award (2001). Selected by Andrew Hudgins, it was published by River City Publishing in 2002, with an introduction by Richard Howard and was a finalist for the Independent Publisher Book Award (2003).

His work has appeared in Literary Review, The New Republic, The Paris Review, Western Humanities Review, Witness, Pleiades, Willow Springs and StoryQuarterly. He has taught at the University of Cincinnati, the Art Academy of Cincinnati, and Emory University where he was Creative Writing Fellow in Poetry from 2001-2003. He was a Charles Phelps Taft Fellow and studied Mexican literature and culture while living in Mexico, and a Tennessee Williams Scholar and Walter Dakin Fellow at the Sewanee Writers’ Conference.

Currently, he is Associate Dean at Rochester Institute of Technology Croatia.

== Bibliography ==
- Either/Ur (River City Publishing, 2002).
