= Melissa Morphew =

American poet

Melissa Morphew (born July 31, 1963) is an American poet.

== Early life and education ==
Melissa Morphew was born July 31, 1963. She is from Lawrenceburg, Tennessee.

Morphew is a graduate of the University of Georgia's PhD program in English.

== Career ==
Morphew's chapbook, Hunger and Heat: The Missionary Letters won the Anabiosis Press Chapbook Award, and was subsequently published by Anabiosis Press in 1995. Her first full-length collection, The Garden Where All Loves End won the La Jolla Poets Press National Poets' Series Award, and as part of the award, received publication in 1997.

In 2006, her full-length collection of poems, Fathom, was published by Turning Point Press.

Morphew's poems can be found in the pages of the most respected U.S. literary journals. Her work has been included in The Georgia Review, Shenandoah, Parnassus: Poetry in Review, and Prairie Schooner.

Morphew formerly taught English and creative writing at Sam Houston State University in Huntsville, Texas.

== Critical reception ==
The poet, Gray Jacobik, writes of Morphew's poems: "... a passion for the medium [language] and a deep knowledge of its possibilities, has joined with the practical skill required to make merry and make sorrowful, take us to bed and to bounty, to the odd and the familiar, to worlds-upon-worlds, and to do so beautifully, lavishly, intricately, and interestingly."

This quote points up the magical realist quality of many of Morphew's poems. Morphew said of her poem "The Barker's Song" in an explanation of the work for Iron Horse Literary Review that she has been striving to write in a magical realist idiom.

In August, 2010, judge Indigo Moor chose Morphew's collection Bluster as the winner of the Sacramento Poetry Center Press Book Award. Moor said:

My choice [was] Bluster because of lines such as: 'he cups/a drunken bee in his hand, puts it to her ear—/loovvvvvvvvvve—/uncups the bee, palm unstung;/love, love, the word throbs her wrist, a razor cut,/but this is retrospect . . .' and '. . . If there is a flower breaking/from the wall, breaking,/the stone cleaved, the petals/cleaved from the marble,/surprised by such blooming,/such fecundity in the midst/of barren rock . . .' Bluster often startled me. The line breaks and form choices were exacting and somehow puckish. Consistently, I was kept off guard by the prospect of what I would find.

== Awards and honours ==
Morphew is the recipient of several national and international poetry prizes, including: The Academy of American Poets College Prize, The Randall Jarrell International Poetry Prize, The Cecil J. Hackney Literary Award in Poetry, The W.B. Yeats' Society Poetry Prize, The Sacramento Poetry Center Press Book Award, and several Pushcart Prize nominations.

Morphew was also awarded a Tennessee Arts Commission Grant in Poetry.
