= Thomas John Carlisle =

American poet

Thomas John Carlisle (October 11, 1913 – August 17, 1992) was an American poet, Presbyterian minister, and an expert on Emily Dickinson. He was born in Plattsburgh, New York, the only son of Ruby Grace Mann and Thomas H. Carlisle. He was educated at Williams College and Union Theological Seminary, New York. He married Dorothy Mae Davis (1912–1990) on August 20, 1936, and was ordained minister at First Presbyterian Church of Plattsburgh in 1937. He also served as minister in Tupper Lake and Delhi, New York. He served as pastor at Stone Street Presbyterian Church, Watertown, New York from 1949–1978. He retired from active ministry in 1978.

His published poetry collections include I Need a Century (1963), You! Jonah! (1968), Celebration (1970), Mistaken Identity (1973), Journey with Job (1976), Eve and After: Old Testament Women in Portrait (1984), Beginning with Mary: Women of the Gospels in Portrait (1986), "Journey with Jonah" (1984); Invisible Harvest (1987), and Looking for Jesus: Poems in Search of the Christ of the Gospels (1993). His poetry has also appeared in the publications alive now! (published by The Upper Room), the Chicago Tribune, the Christian Science Monitor, and The New York Times. His love poem "Rise Up, My Love, My Fair One" with music by Dr. Arthur W. Frackenpohl has been published as a choir anthem and as a solo by Shawnee Press, Delaware Water Gap, Pennsylvania. He is buried at Brookside Cemetery, Watertown, New York. The Thomas John Carlisle Papers are housed at St. Lawrence University in Canton, NY.
