= Paul Metcalf =

American writer

Paul C. Metcalf (7 November 1917 – 21 January 1999) was an American writer. He wrote in verse and prose. Devoted admirers included Robert Creeley, William Gass, Wendell Berry, Guy Davenport, Howard Zinn, and Bruce Olds. His books include Will West (1956), Genoa (1965), Patagoni (1971), Apalache (1976), The Middle Passage (1976), Zip Odes (1979), and U.S. Dept. of the Interior (1980). He was the great-grandson of one of his major literary influences, Herman Melville.

== Biography ==
Paul Metcalf was born in 1917 in East Milton, Massachusetts. He attended Harvard but disliked it and dropped out in the first year. In 1942, he married Nancy Blackford of South Carolina. Over the next two decades the couple spent long periods in the South.

Metcalf traveled widely through North and South America. He drew from these travels for his works. Among his friends and associates were the poet Charles Olson (whom he met when he was thirteen), the artist Josef Albers, poet and publisher Jonathan Williams, and the writer Guy Davenport.

Later in his career, Metcalf was a visiting professor at the University of California San Diego, SUNY Albany, and the University of Kansas. In 1996–97, Coffee House Press issued a Metcalf's collected works from 1956 to 1997 in three volumes. He died in 1999, near Pittsfield, Massachusetts.

== Material, preoccupations, form ==
Metcalf's work draws on a wide range of material, including history, anthropology and folklore, travel narratives, geography, Indian lore, geology, and physiology. His work is difficult to classify according to the conventional categories of essay, journal, and fiction; thus his label as an "experimental" writer.

Form and structure are of utmost importance to his art. Characteristic of his method is the assemblage of texts from a variety of sources fused into a new whole, and much of his work melds these several voices with that of his own. His earliest works used common fictional devices (storyline, characterization, dialogue), but soon Metcalf began pushing past such conventions. His novel Genoa (1965), subtitled "A Telling of Wonders," is a portrait of two physically deformed brothers, one a vagabond / murderer, and the other, a mediocre doctor and the narrator of the story. Interleaved with their story are passages from Melville and the journals of Christopher Columbus, dropped into the mind of the narrator. These serve to mythologize the events of the novel. The writer Guy Davenport described Genoa as being a "built" thing: "an architecture of analogies, similitudes, and Melvillean metaphor."

In later works, Patagoni (1971), for instance, and especially by Apalache (1976), the semblance of story is gone. Apalache is a collage of texts taken from early American journals, exploration narratives, and newspaper articles that Metcalf uses to reconstruct American history in epic scope and form. Like William Carlos Williams before him, Metcalf freely mixes verse and prose.

Waters of Potowmack (1982), a documentary history of the Potomac River, and other works such as U.S. Dept. of the Interior (1980) and I-57 (1988), continue Metcalf's preoccupation with "juxtaposition" and documentary forms. Other Metcalf works include The Island (1982), Golden Delicious (1985), and Huascaran(1997).

In describing his technique, Metcalf uses the word "juxtaposition": the union of seemingly disparate or disjointed elements. These elements, what the poet Donald Byrd refers to as "immense rhymes," are the building blocks of Metcalf's books. Greater than single words, they are often whole passages from other texts. "The difference is simply the size and proportion of the units I use: instead of words, I use whole lives, concepts, episodes, epochs." Metcalf quotes a remark of Edgar Allan Poe as it applies to his own work, "To originate, is carefully, patiently, and understandingly to combine." He emphasizes the organizing intelligence as opposed to random association and the "cut-ups" that are a hallmark of writers such as William Burroughs."

Metcalf's books have also been described in terms of music—"symphonic", "polyphonic," emphasizing the multitude of voices within that blend into one. His work was influenced by Ezra Pound (especially the Cantos), William Carlos Williams (Paterson, In the American Grain), and Charles Olson (Call Me Ishmael, parts of the Maximus Poems).

== Honors ==
His papers from 1917 to 1999 are held in the Henry W. and Albert A. Berg Collection of English and American Literature, New York Public Library.

== Works ==
- Will West. Asheville: Jonathan Williams, 1956.
- Genoa. Penland, NC: The Jargon Society, 1965. (Most recent edition of interest: Minneapolis: Coffee House Press, 2015.)
- Patagoni. Penland, NC: The Jargon Society, 1971.
- The Middle Passage: A Triptych of Commodities. Highlands, NC: The Jargon Society, 1976
- Apalache. Berkeley, CA: Turtle Island Foundation, 1976.
- Zip Odes. Lawrence, KS: Tansy Press, 1979.
- Willie's Throw. San Francisco: Five Trees Press, 1979.
- U.S. Dept. of the Interior. Frankfort, KY: Gnomon Press, 1980.
- Both. [no location given]: The Jargon Society, 1982.
- Waters of Potowmack. San Francisco: North Point Press, 1982.
- The Island. Lawrence, KS: Tansy Press, 1982.
- Louis the Torch. Flushing, NY: CrossCountry Press, 1983.
- Golden Delicious. Tucson: Chax Press, 1985.
- Where Do You Put the Horse? Essays. Elmwood, IL: Dalkey Archive Press, 1986.
- Firebird. Minneapolis/Tucson: Chax Press & Granary Books, 1987.
- I-57. New Haven: LongRiver Books, 1988.
- Headlands: The Marin Coast at the Golden Gate. (Text by Metcalf; original photography, archival research, and book design by Miles DeCoster, Mark Klett, Mike Mandel and Larry Sultan, respectively.) Albuquerque: U of New Mexico P, 1989.
- “Winslow Homer and His Era.” Winslow Homer at the Addison. Andover, MA: The Addison Gallery of American Art, 1990. pp. 33–70.
- Enter Isabel: The Herman Melville Correspondence of Clare Spark and Paul Metcalf. Edited and annotated by Metcalf. Albuquerque: University of New Mexico Press, 1991.
- Mountaineers Are Always Free! Flint, MI: Bamberger Books, 1991.
- Araminta and the Coyotes. Highlands, NC: The Jargon Society, 1991.
- “... and nobody objected.” Providence, RI: Paradigm Press, 1992.
- Three Plays. North Carolina Wesleyan College Press, 1993. (Containing An American Chronicle: A Two-Act Documentary Drama, The Confidence-Man, and The Players: A Documentary Comedy-Drama.)
- Collected Works. Vol. I: 1956–1976. Vol. II: 1976–1986. Vol. III 1987–1997. Introduction by Guy Davenport. Minneapolis: Coffee House Press. 1996–97. (Containing two previously unpublished works: Huascarán (a poem sequence), and “The White Whale of Kansas” (essay).)
- Merrill Cove. Minneapolis: Rain Taxi, 1998. (Limited edition chapbook, composed in 1956 and 1957.)
- From Quarry Road: Uncollected Essays and Reviews of Paul Metcalf. Edited and with an introduction by Robert Buckeye; preface by Jonathan Williams. East Middlebury: Amandla Publishing, 2002.
- Working the Stone: The Natural, Social, and Industrial History of the Village of Farnams, Town of Cheshire, County of Berkshire, Commonwealth of Massachusetts. With Lucia Saradoff. San Diego: San Diego State University Press, 2003.

== Sources / External links ==
- Description of Metcalf's collection of essays, Where Do You Put the Horse?, Dalkey Archive
- Transcript of an interview with Metcalf by John O'Brien of the Review of Contemporary Fiction, Dalkey Archive
- David McCooey. No Wooden Horse review of Metcalf's Collected Works (Coffee House Press)
- New York Times Obituary; Paul Metcalf, 81; Wrote Experimental Tales
- Gargoyle Magazine Interview, 1983
- John O'Brien: "The Man Who Would Ban Happy Endings"; The New York Observer, 2011
- Don Byrd. "Review of Metcalf's Collected Works
- Coffee House Press page for Metcalf's Collected Works, Volume I
- Isola Di Rifuiti. John Latta. (One of many "stray notes" on Metcalf.)
- Guy Davenport. Introduction to the Metcalf's Collected Works, Volume One. Coffee House Press, 1996: Minneapolis
- Paul Metcalf Papers, 1917-1999, Henry W. and Albert A. Berg Collection of English and American Literature of the New York Public Library.
- Longform study by Jacob Siefring
