= Catherine Doty =

American poet and cartoonist

- Born: November 1, 1952 (age 73); South Paterson, New Jersey, U.S.
- Education: Upsala College; University of Iowa
- Writing career
- Genre: Poetry

Catherine Doty (born South Paterson, New Jersey) is an American poet and cartoonist currently residing in Boonton, New Jersey. She attended Upsala College and later the University of Iowa where she received an MFA (Master of Fine Arts) in poetry. She is the recipient of the Paterson Poetry Prize, an Academy of American Poets Prize, and fellowships from the National Endowment for the Arts, the New Jersey State Council on the Arts, and the New York Foundation for the Arts.

== Awards ==
- Academy of American Poets Prize
- Fellowship from the New Jersey State Council on the Arts (2012)
- Fellowship from the New York Foundation for the Arts
- National Endowment for the Arts Fellowship in Poetry (2011)

== Published works ==
- Keillor, Garrison, ed. (2005). "Yes". Good Poems for Hard Times. Viking. p. 71. ISBN 9780670034369.
- Momentum. CavanKerry Press. 2004. ISBN 9780972304504.
- Just Kidding: Cartoons from the Play Pen of Catherine Doty. Avocet Press. 1999. ISBN 0-9661072-6-8.
- Wonderama. 2025. ISBN 978-1-933880-82-2

== Sources ==
- "Interview with Catherine Doty". Kicking Wind (blog). 30 July 2007.
- "Playwrights Theatre of NJ: 5 Questions with Catherine Doty". Playwrights Theatre of NJ. 27 September 2013.
- "Dodge Poet Spotlight: Catherine Doty". Geraldine R. Dodge Foundation. Geraldine R. Dodge Foundation. 2 October 2013.
