= David Gitin =

American poet

David D. Gitin
- Born: December 19, 1941; Buffalo, New York
- Died: 27 June 2015 (aged 73); Key Largo, Florida
- Occupation: Poet
- Writing career
- Language: English

David Daniel Gitin (December 19, 1941 – June 27, 2015) was an American poet and author.

== Background ==
Gitin was born in Buffalo, New York on December 19, 1941. He graduated from the State University of New York at Buffalo with a B.A. in 1966; from San Francisco State College with an M.A. in 1971; and did graduate study at the University of Wisconsin in Madison from 1972 to 1973.

He lived in San Francisco's Haight-Ashbury district from 1967 to 1970 where he was part of the Straight Theatre and the cofounder of the Poets' Theatre in 1968. At the I-Thou Coffeehouse, he directed a series of readings by the leading poets of the day while he worked as a counter person. At San Francisco State College (now University), he was a professor at the new Free University of San Francisco. Not making money as a poet he went to work at Greyhound Lines as a baggage clerk from 1968 to 1970. Subsequent jobs included manager of the Full Moon Bookstore, San Francisco, 1971. He held many different jobs, from coffeehouse counter person to postal clerk, social caseworker, record salesperson and library page. After a period in Cotati, California he eventually settled in Monterey, California, working as a jazz disc jockey as well as teaching English at Monterey Peninsula College, Hartnell College and Fort Ord and producing a reading series that included Carl Rakosi, Michael McClure, Ron Silliman, Allan Kornblum, Lorenzo Thomas, Jeanine Pommy Vega, Diane di Prima, Maureen Owen and Bernadette Mayer to name just a few.

He also taught at the University of Wisconsin Extension School, Madison in 1971, as professor of English, 1971–74; and at Chapman University, Orange, California, professor of English, 1974. His final teaching position was at Monterey Peninsula College. He was a professor of humanities there from 1974 to 2007. After retirement he moved to Key Largo, Florida to live with his reunited teenage love, Gloria Avner.

His work was influenced by the writings and friendship of Allen Ginsberg, Charles Olson, and Robert Creeley before he moved to San Francisco in the mid-60s where he co-founded Poets Theater with Jim Wilson, edited the small press magazine Bricoleur, and produced radio programs for KPFA in Berkeley from 1967 to 1971.

== Reviews and accolades ==
Poet Michael McClure has referred to Gitin as "an obsessed, serious artist who has never lost his light heart and deep passion, and who has been among those of us who have cared since the early sixties" and said that "the surface and tensile qualities of the poems are gorgeous . . . the refinement of a master". The American Library Association calls Gitin an original and says " he focuses on detail and precise motion of moments" and "looks beyond what is at hand, either within his own sensibility or reflected in time". The Small Press Review says that Gitin is "a master of plugging us into how objects actually relate, on both the micro-scales and the larger integrities that make up 'the world'". Cid Corman wrote to David Gitin "I'm partial to such quietness - where words are allowed to say what the poet has felt in startling upon them. Each word a flame in the bonfire around which night gathers us in the end." A.R. Ammons said "You (Gitin) touch a sort of Zen infinitude." And Carl Rakosi said, "Mr. Gitin understands what is poetically worth observing...the minimum for giving one a lift...and what would be too much." George Oppen said, "assembled 'against the wall' [the poems] spell out, and frequently with brilliant precision, 'what has happened.' "Spare, lyric, and haunting - these poems offer the starkest of silhouettes, the obscurest of shadows. Gitin is not interested in spelling it out. Pay attention, he seems to be saying, listen carefully: much is revealed, in little." Bookpaper, December 1989. "In "This Once" we encounter New York phenomenological report & Objectivist sincerity side by side with what would later be dubbed by Gitin's contemporaries (like friend Silliman) L=A=N=G=U=A=G=U=E writing. For instance, see the incredible "Careens," which places Gitin squarely in the company of Clark Coolidge and Jackson MacLow...Shorter work reminds one of Robert Grenier, Tom Raworth, the later Creeley...Add to that the linguistic grace of a Chinese brush painting...a major voice doing the work that had to be done"

== Live recordings: Penn Sound ==
Reading at Stone Avenue Gallery, Tucson, October 27, 2007, Appearing on Public Access Poetry with Nancy Ancrum, December 22, 1977

Interview with David Gitin and his wife, Joyce (later named Maria) Gitin 1969

== Selected publications ==
- Guitar against the Wall. Los Angeles: Panjandrum Press. 1972. ASIN B0006CC47E.
- City Air. Ithaca, New York: Ithaca House. 1974. ISBN 978-0-8788-6041-8.
- Ideal Space Relations. Morgan Press. 1976. ASIN B003QA7OAA.
- Legwork. Kensington, California: Oyez. 1977. ASIN B000UBINTY.
- This Once. Berkeley, California: Blue Wind Press. 1979. ISBN 978-0-9126-5249-8.
- Vacuum Tapestries. England: BB Books. 1980. ASIN B0018D1Y8K.
- Fire Dance. Berkeley, California: Blue Wind Press. 1989. ISBN 978-0-9126-5275-7.
- Passing Through. Linehan Press. 2005. ISBN 978-0-9126-5275-7.
- The Journey Home. Berkeley, California: Blue Wind Press. 2010. ISBN 978-0-9126-5279-5.
- Woke Up This Morning: Selected Poems 1962-2014. Berkeley, California: Blue Wind Press. 2015. ISBN 978-0-9126-5280-1.

Work represented in anthologies, including Voices of Poetry, 1971, Elman Publishing, 1971; Mark in Time, edited by Nick Harvey, Glide Publications, 1971; Poets West, edited by Laurence Spingarn, Perivale (Van Nuys, CA), 1976; and Poets and Writers of Monterey Bay, edited by Ken Weisner, 1999. Contributor of poems and critical articles to journals and little magazines in the United States and abroad, including This, Work, New: American and Canadian Poetry, Greenfield Review, Intent, La-Bas, Interstate, Ironwood, Carolina Quarterly, Western Humanities Review, Penumbra, Rolling Stone, Tuatara, Wisconsin Review, Io, Kansas Quarterly, Tree, New York Times, Poetry Flash, Big Bridge, and Paideuma. Editor, Bricoleur, 1969, and Touch, 1971; guest editor, Amphora, October, 1971.

"My own work from 1962 onward is indebted to some of the Beats who were personal friends: Allen Ginsberg, John Wieners, Gregory Corso, Michael McClure (who continues to be), Janine Vega. You don't have Kay Johnson there, who was one of the first active women in the 'movement'. When I produced Poets Theater in San Francisco in the '60s, I presented her, Janine, Herbert Huncke, Diane DiPrima, Lew Welch, Philip Whalen, et al. I also had a poetry program on KPFA in Berkeley where I promoted these and others. The magazine I edited, Bricoleur (1969), included McClure, Wakoski, Meltzer, etc. and a later one, The Amphora, featured DiPrima, Levertov, et al. My first book, Guitar Against The Wall, was published in San Francisco (1972). The first responses I received were from Ginsberg and Ferlinghetti."
