= Louis Hasley =

American writer, poet, essayist, editor, and critic

Louis Leonard Hasley (November 3, 1906 – May 1986) was an American writer, poet, essayist, editor, and critic. He was also a professor of English at the University of Notre Dame from 1931 to 1973. He was married to the writer Lucile Hasley.
