= Erik Manuel Soto =

American poet

- Education: University of Nevada
- Occupation: Poet laureate of Vallejo, California (2026-2027)
- Writing career
- Genre: poetry
- Literary movement: surrealism

Erik Manuel Soto is a Mexican-American poet. In 2026 he was named poet laureate of Vallejo, California. He holds a Master of Arts from Sonoma State University and a Master of Fine Arts in Creative Writing from the University of Nevada at Reno.

Several literary journals have all featured his poetry, including Antiphony, Volt, the Nelligan, River and South Review, Huizache, Zaum, The Dewdrop, and Sonora Review . What Books Press published his first poetry collection, Inside the Umber Iris, in October 2025. Prior to being selected as Vallejo's poet laureate, Soto performed at Sonoma State University, The Village Well in Culver City, Medicine for Nightmares Bookstore and Gallery, Beyond Baroque, Los Angeles Public Library, and Napa Bookmine. As poet laureate Soto has performed at the No Kings Day 3 rally in Vallejo, Fiestas Primavera in Benicia, Voices at the Table, Red Man's Hall, and the Vacaville Museum.

== Awards ==
- Gronk Nicandro First Book Prize for Poetry for Inside the Umber Iris, 2025

== Publications ==
=== Books ===
- Inside the Umber Iris, What Books Press, 2025 ISBN 9798990014985

=== Poetry ===
- “Promiscuity That Kills” Zaum Magazine, Vol 21
- “What Comfort in Liquor” Zaum Magazine, Vol 22
- 2024 “Ambulance” River & South Review Issue 13: Summer 2024
- January 17, 2025 “Low Grade Regression” Sonora Review
- March 23, 2025 “Séance Under a Lunar Eclipse” The Dewdrop
- 2025 “Flung” Spectacle, Summer 2025

== See also ==
- D.L. Lang
- Jeremy Snyder
- Genea Brice
- Kathleen Herrmann
- Jacalyn Eyvonne
- List of municipal poets laureate in California
