= List of municipal poets laureate in California =

This is a list of past and current municipal poets laureate serving towns, counties, and cities in California.

== Cities ==
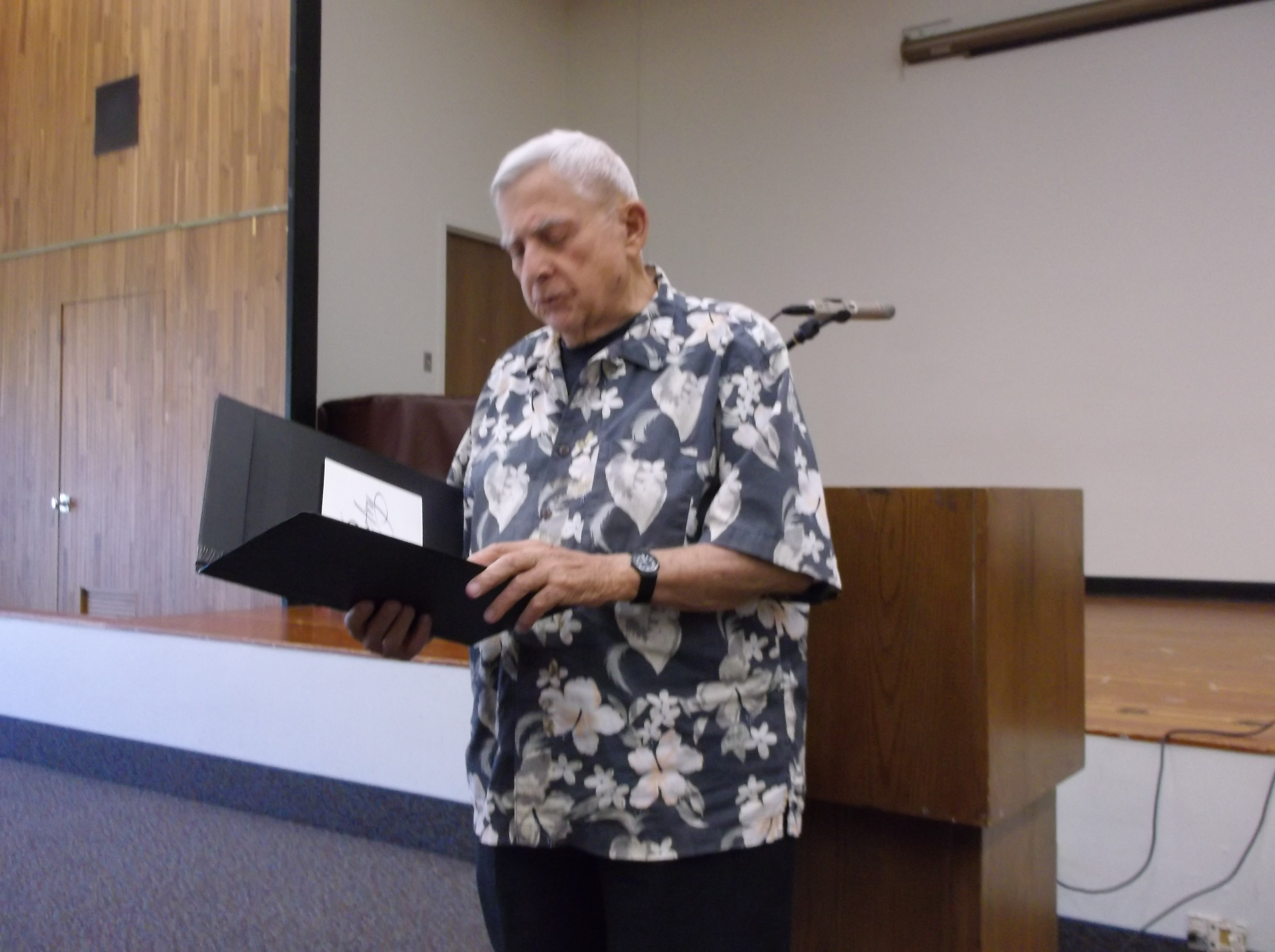
Benicia Poet Laureate Joel Fallon

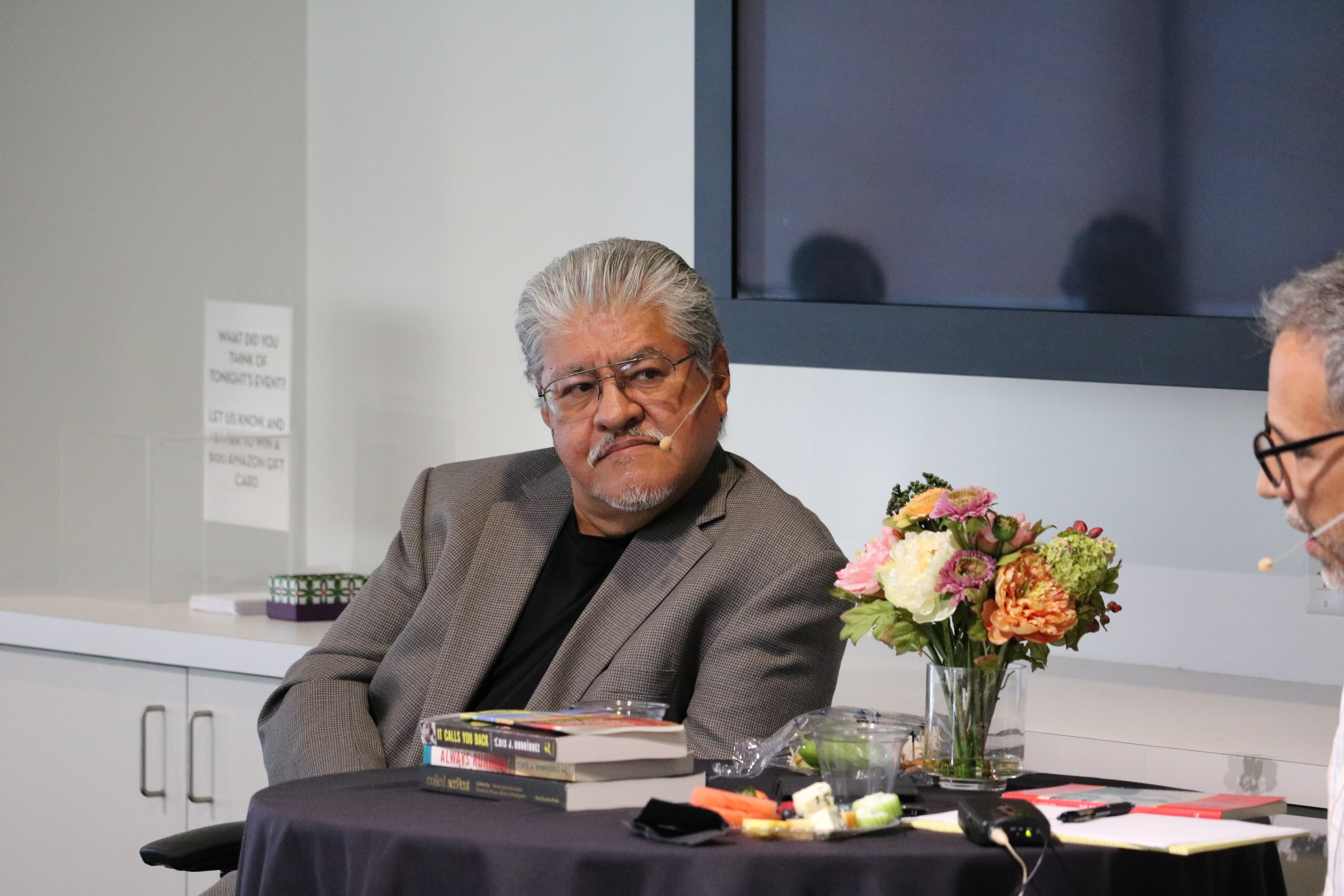
Luis Rodriguez, Los Angeles Poet Laureate

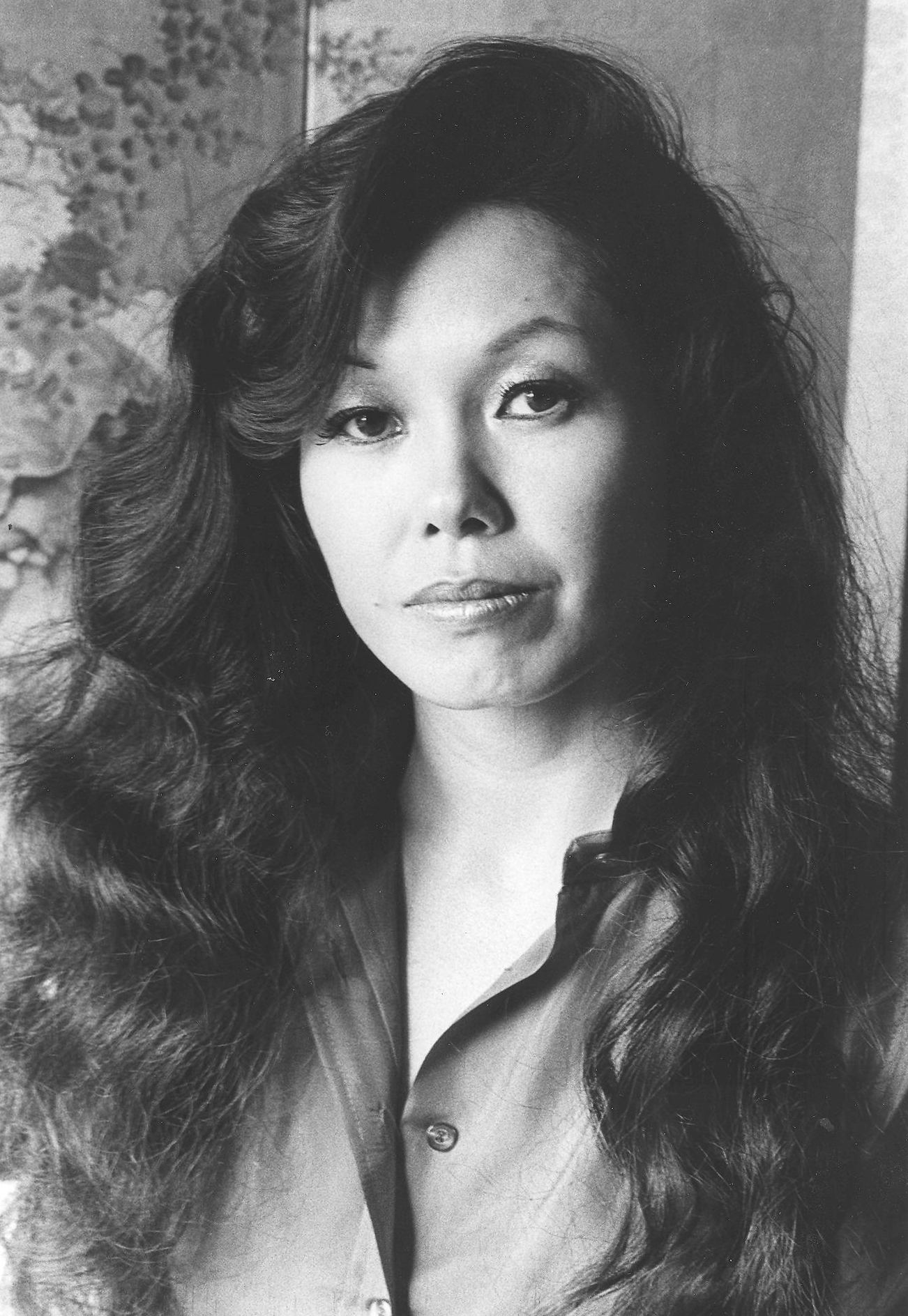
Janice Mirikitani was Poet Laureate of San Francisco in 2000

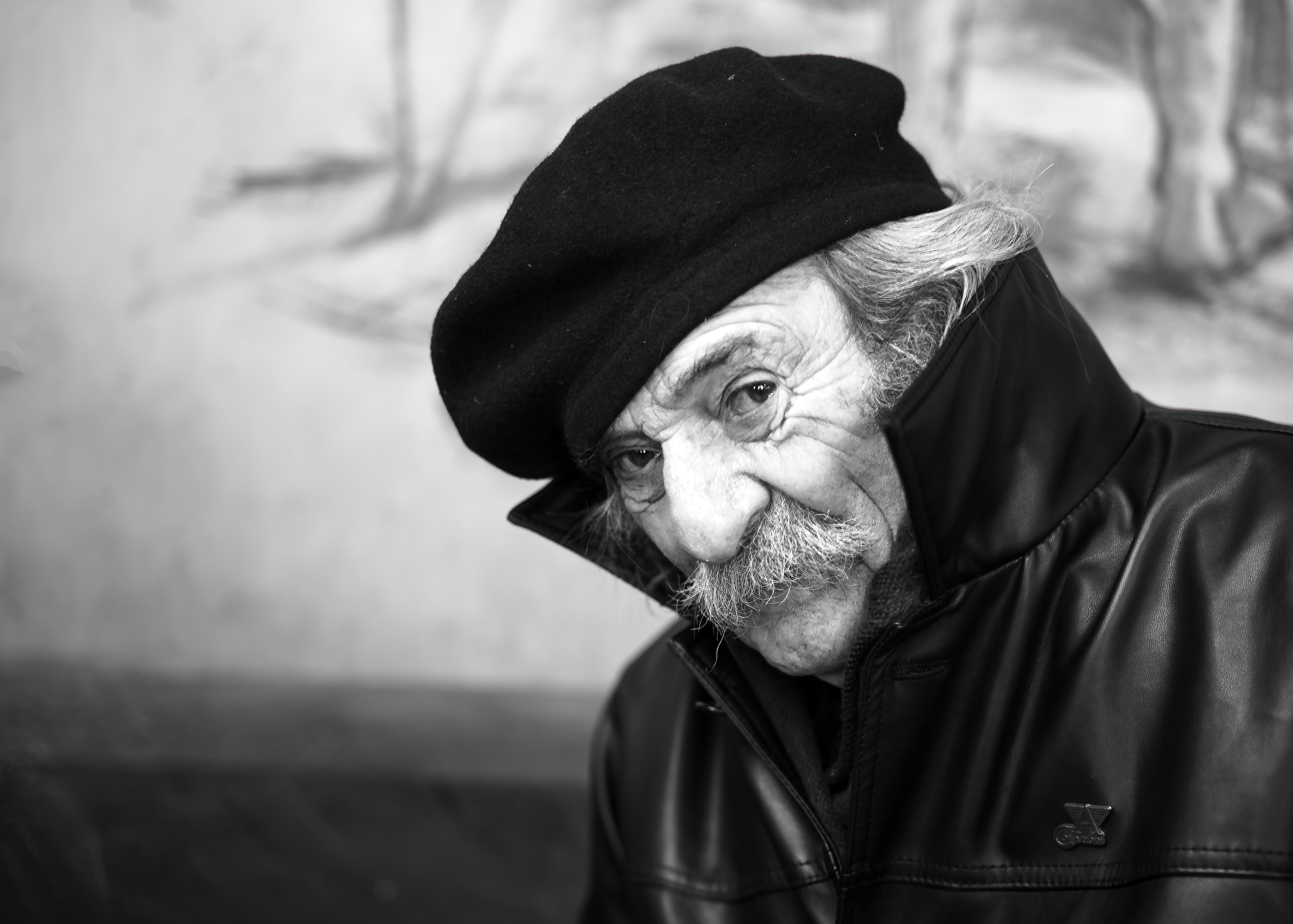
Jack Hirschman was poet laureate of San Francisco in 2006.

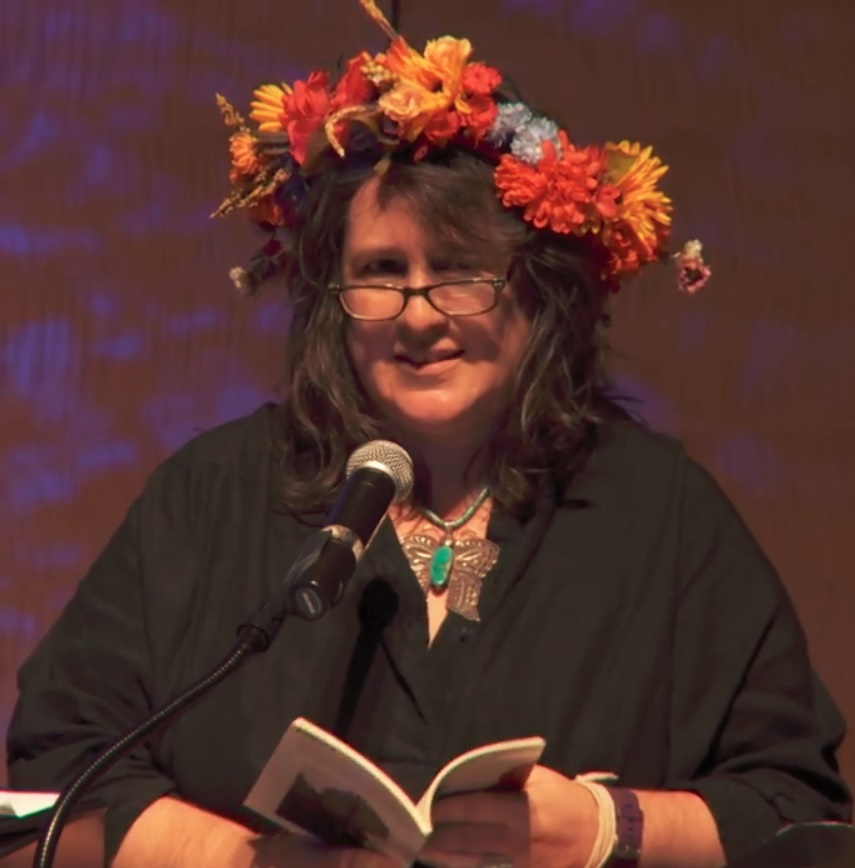
Kim Shuck was Poet Laureate of San Francisco in 2017.

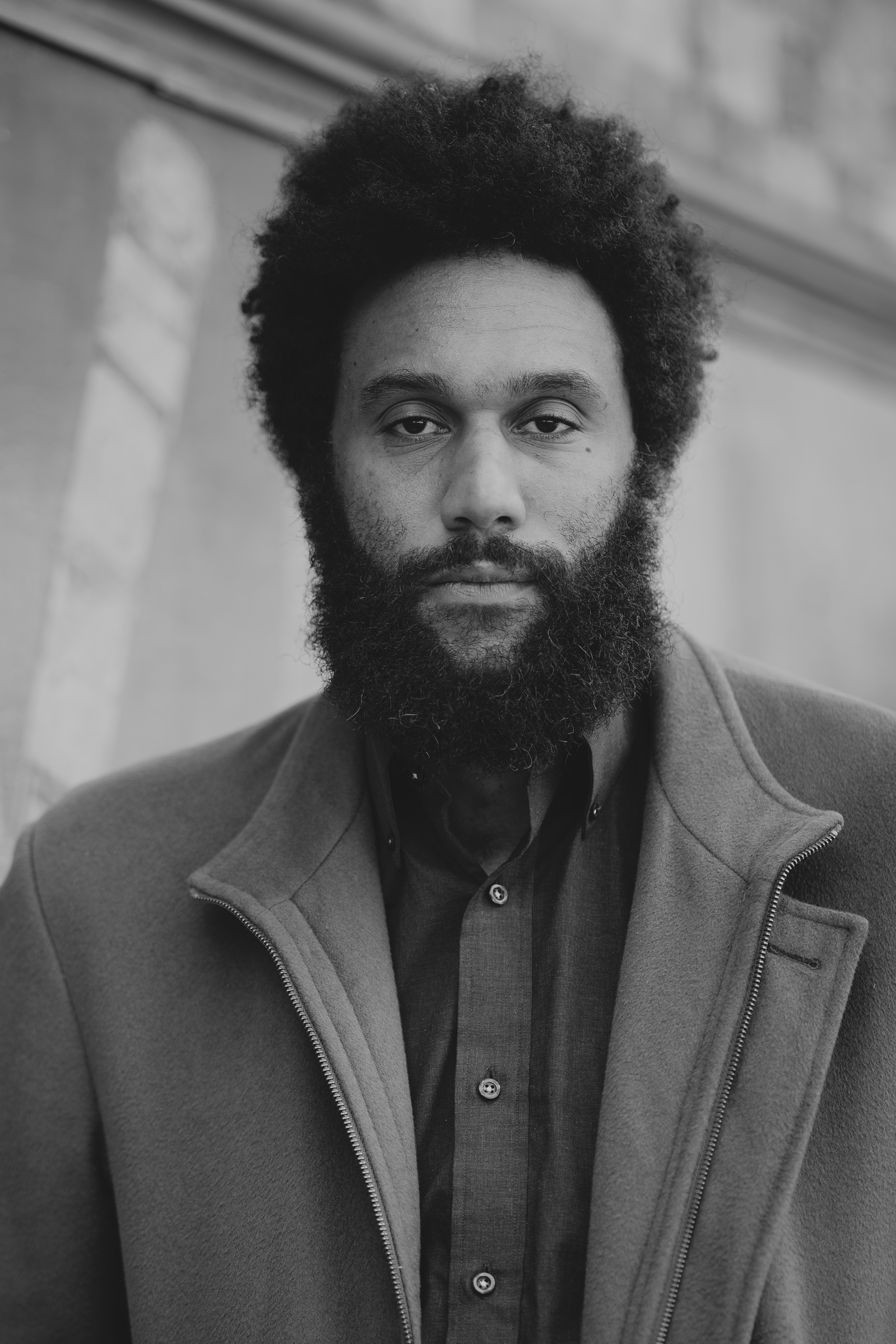
Tongo Eisen-Martin is poet laureate of San Francisco.

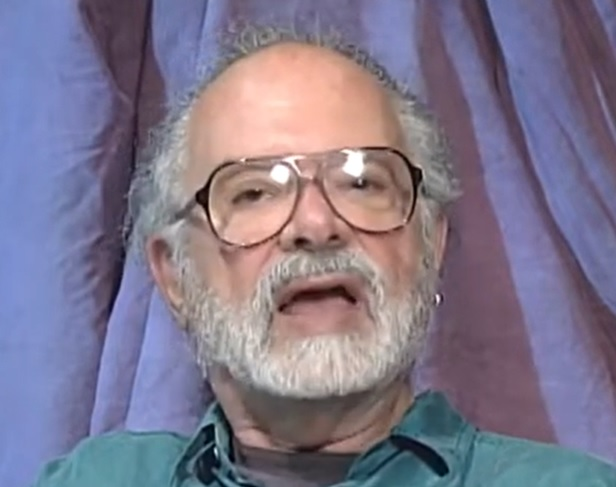
Barry Spacks was poet laureate of Santa Barbara in 2005.

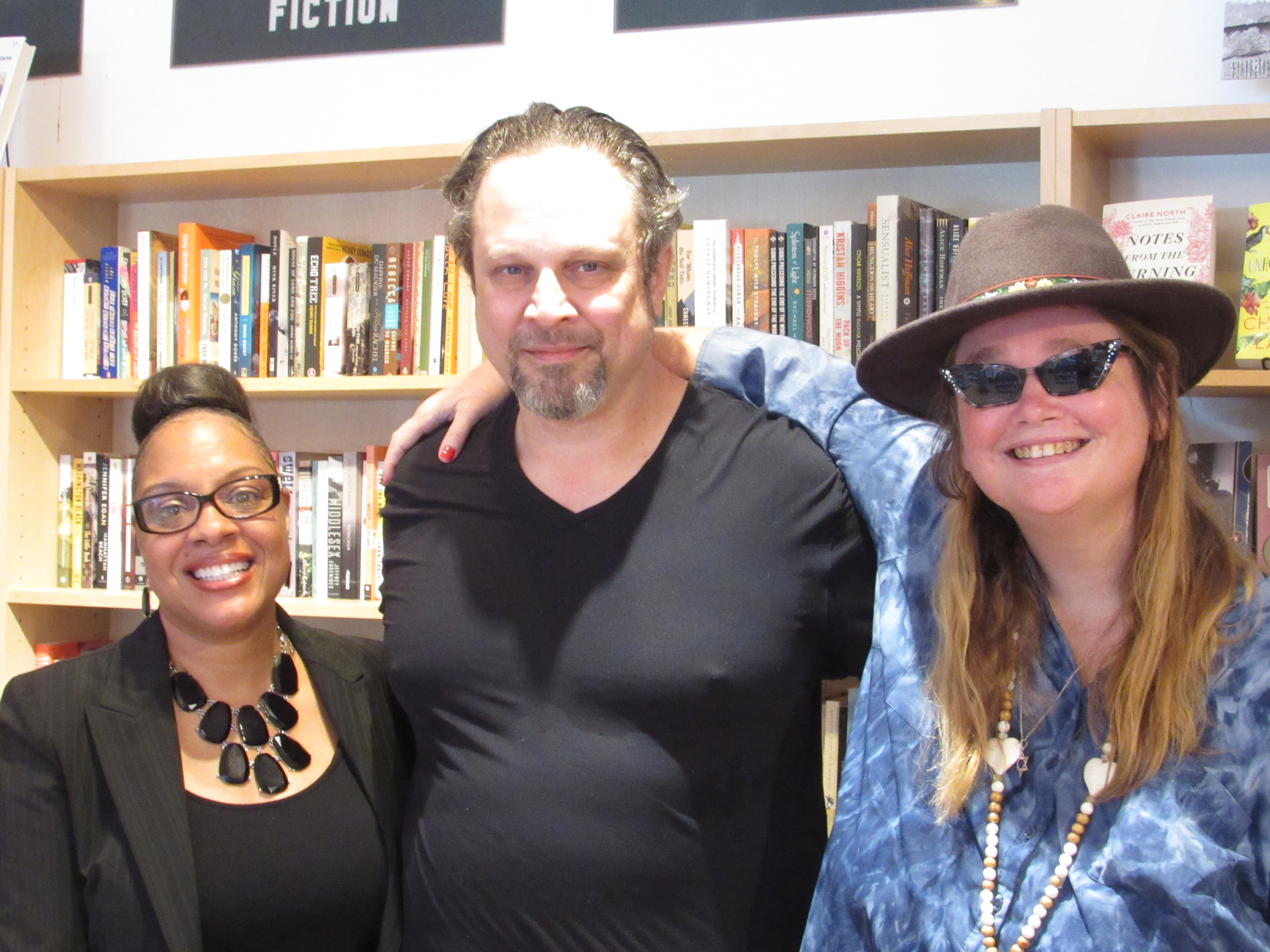
Genea Brice, Jeremy Snyder, and D. L. Lang, poets laureate of Vallejo.

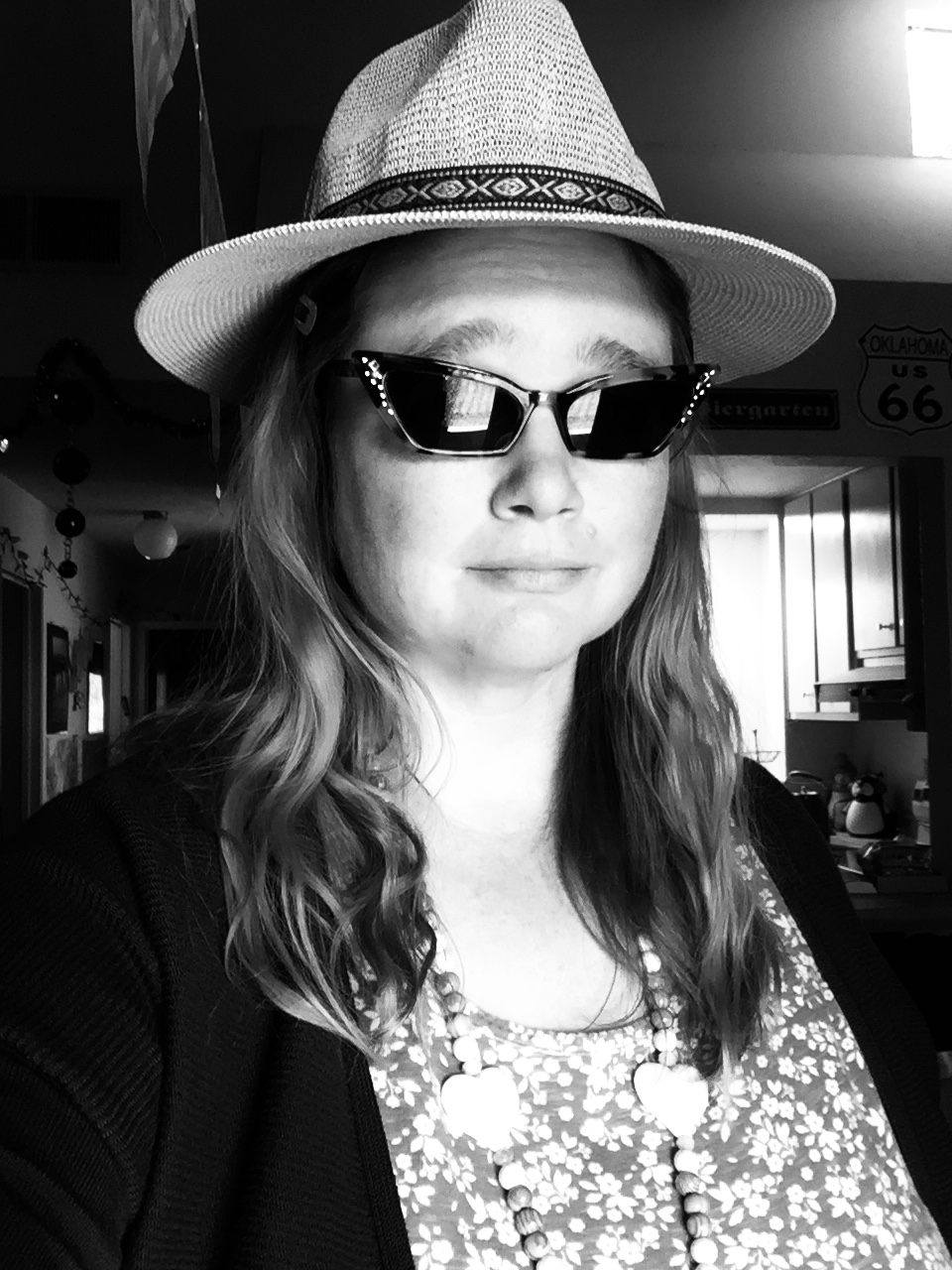
D. L. Lang was poet laureate of Vallejo in 2017.

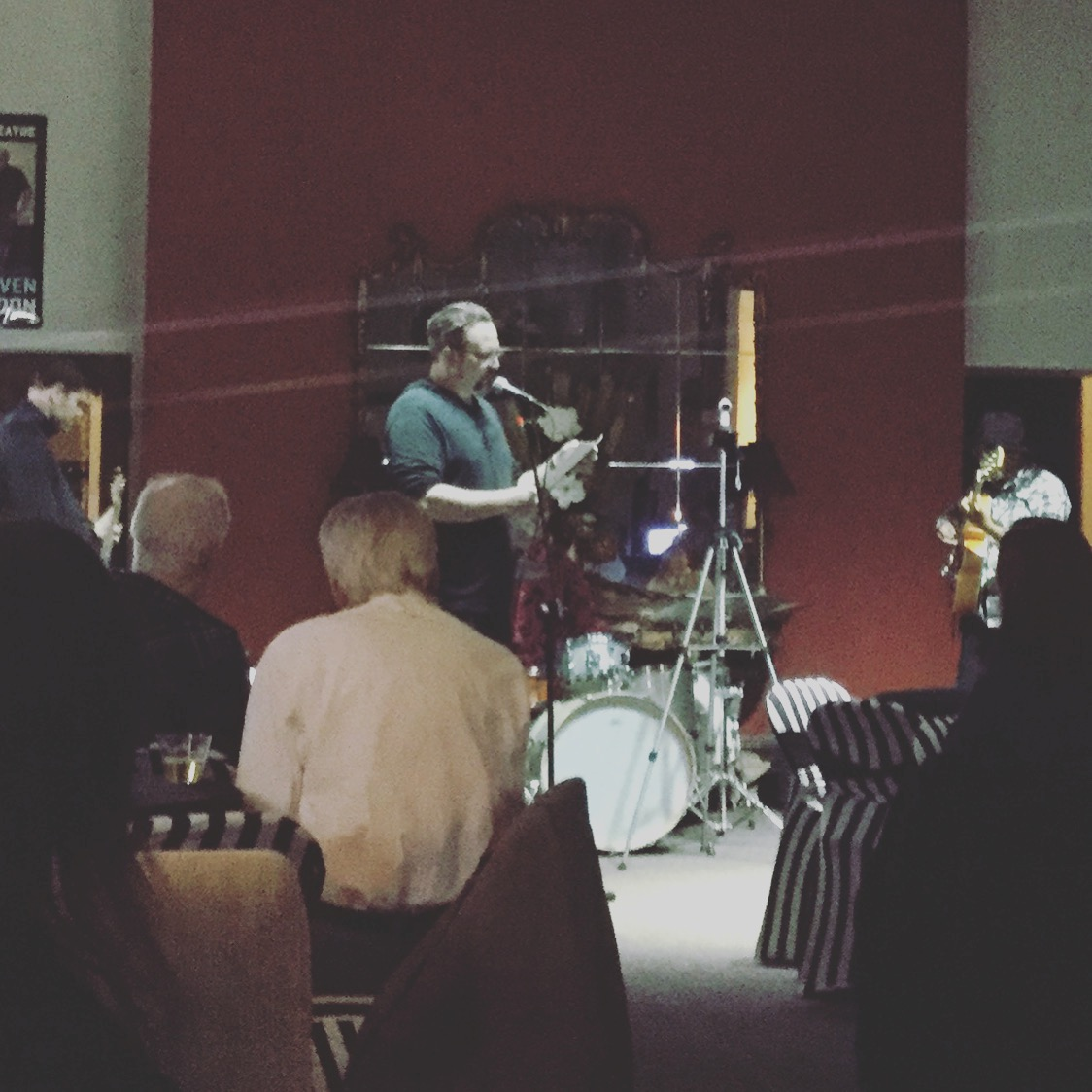
Vallejo Poet Laureate Jeremy Snyder

=== Alameda ===
- Mary Rudge (2002–2014)
- Julia Park Tracey (2014–2017)
- Cathy Dana and Gene Kahane (2017–2020)
- Kimi Sugioka (2020– )

=== Albany ===
- Christina Hutchins (2008–2012)
- Toby Bielawski (2012–2016)
- Rebecca Black (2016–2020)

=== Altadena ===
- Jean Burden (appt. 1976)
- Ralph Lane (2006–2008)
- Marcia Thompson (2008–2010)
- Alene Terzian (2010–2012)
- Linda Dove (2012–2014)
- Thelma T. Reyna (2014–2016)
- Elline Lipkin (2016–2018)
- Hazel Clayton Harrison and Teresa Mei Chuc (2018–2020)
- Jessica Abughattas and Khadija Anderson (2020–2022)
- Peter J. Harris and Carla R. Sameth (2022–2024)
- Lester Graves Lennon and Sehba Sarwar (2024–2026)

=== Anaheim ===
- Grant Heir (2018–2020)
- Wendy Van Camp (2022–2024)
- Camille Hernandez (2024-)

=== Antioch ===
- Jose "Cordon Concepts" Cordón (2024– )

=== Belmont ===
- Tanuja Wakefield (2014-2018)
- Jacki Rigoni (2018-2021)
- Monica Korde (2021–2024)

=== Benicia ===
- Joel Fallon (2006–2008)
- Robert Shelby (2008–2010)
- Ronna Leon (2010–2012)
- Lois Requist (2012–2014)
- Don Peery (2014–2016)
- Johanna Ely (2016–2018)
- Tom Stanton (2018–2020)
- Mary Susan Gast (2020–2023)
- Katrina "Kathy" Monroe (2024–2026)
- David Hakim (2026-2028)

=== Berkeley ===
- Julia Vinograd [recognised officially as Berkeley's unofficial poet laureate in 2004]
- Rafael Jesús González (2017–2023)
- Aya de León (2024–2025)

=== Brentwood ===
- Diane Lando (inaugural; 2006–2008)
- Kati Short (2010–2021)
- Mary Jane Barnes

=== Compton ===
- Elmo Bridges (appt. 1983)

=== Crockett ===
- Ruth Blakeney (inaugural; 2006)

=== Culver City ===
- Janet Hoult (2015–2017)

=== Cupertino ===
- David Denny (2011–2013)
- Jennifer Swanton Brown (2013–2015)
- Amanda Williamsen (2016)
- Ann Muto (2016–2017)
- Kaecey McCormick (2018–2020)
- Jing Jing Yang (2020–2022)
- Keiko O'Leary (2023–2024)

=== Danville ===
- Nancy Fraze (2008–2011)
- Lea Kagel (2011–2013)

=== Davis ===
- Allegra Silberstein (2010-–2012)
- Eve West Bessier (2012-–2014)
- Andy Jones (2014-–2018)
- James Lee Jobe (2018-–2021)
- Julia B. Levine (2022-–2024)
- Mercedes Ibáñez (2024–2026)

=== Dublin ===
- Ronnie Holland (2008–2010)
- James Moorehead (2021–2024)
- Richard Deets (2025— )

=== East Palo Alto ===
- Kalamu Chaché (1983– )

=== El Cerrito ===
- Maw Shein Win (2016–2018)
- Danielle “Dani” Gabriel (2018–2020)
- Eevelyn Mitchell (2021–2023)
- Tess Taylor (2024–2026)

=== El Segundo ===
- Hope Anita Smith (2022–2023)

=== Emeryville ===
- Janell Moon (2010–2012)
- Sarah Kobrinsky (2013–2015)

=== Encinitas ===
- Trish Dugger (2005)

=== Escalon ===
- Jonathon "Jonnie" Cabello (2024– )

=== Eureka ===
- David Holper (2019–2021)
- Wil Gibson (2021–2022)

=== Fairfield ===
- Juanita J. Martin (2010–2012)
- Bonnie DiMichele (2020–2022)
- Suzanne Bruce (2022–2024)
- Michael J. Wyly (2025–2027)

=== Fresno ===
- James Pablo Tyner Contreras (2013–2015)
- Lee Herrick (2015–2017)
- S. Bryan Medina (2017–2019)
- Marisol Baca (2019–2021)
- Megan Anderson Bohigian (2021–2023)
- Joseph Rios (2023–2025)
- Aideed Medina (2025–)

=== Glendale ===
- Raffi Joe Wartanian (2023– )

=== Hayward ===
- Bruce Roberts (2015–2024)
- Leticia Guzman (2024–present)

=== Lafayette/Orinda ===
- Amy Glynn (2018–2020)

=== Laguna Beach ===
- Kate Buckley (2017–2018)
- Karen Wood (2018–2019)

=== Lathrop ===
- Jose Garcia Martin (Inaugural; 2025– )

=== Livermore ===
- Connie Post (2005–2009)
- Cher Wollard (2009–2013)
- Kevin Gunn (2013–2017)
- Cynthia Patton (2017–2022)
- Peggy Schimmelman (2022–2026)
- Faith Alpher (2026–present)

=== Lodi ===
- Nancy Gonzalez St. Clair (2023– )

=== Los Angeles ===
- Eloise Klein Healy (2012–2014)
- Luis J. Rodriguez (2014–2017)
- Robin Coste Lewis (2017–2019)
- Lynne Thompson (2021–2022)

==== Pacific Palisades ====
- Michelle Bitting (appointed in 2012)

==== Sunland-Tujunga ====
- Marlene Hitt (inaugural, 1999–2000)
- Katerina Canyon (2000–2004)
- Joe DeCenzo (2004–2006)
- Ursula Gibson (2006–2008)
- Damien Stednitz (2008–2010)
- Maja Trochimczyk (2010–2012)
- Dorothy Skiles (2012–2014)
- Elsa Frausto (2014–2017)
- Pamela Shea (2017–2019)

=== Los Gatos ===
- Jen Siraganian (2021–2023)
- William Ward Butler (2024–2027)

=== Malibu ===
- Ricardo Means Ybarra (2017–2019)
- Ellen Reich (2019–2020)
- John Struloeff (2020–2021)
- Ann Buxie (2021–2023)
- Nathan Hassall (2023–2025)

=== Manteca ===
- Tara Rico (2024– )

=== Merced ===
- Joyce Dale (inaugural; 2025– )

=== Modesto ===
- Jeannette Gould Maino (1994–1996)
- Arlene Silva Mattos (1996–2000)
- Debee Loyd (2000–2004)
- Sam Pierstoff (2004–2008)
- Ed Bearden (2008–2012)
- Gillian Wegener (2012–2016)
- Stella Beratlis (2016–2020)
- Salvatore Salerno (2020–2024)
- Angela Drew (2024– )

=== National City ===
- Rubia Miller (1970)

=== Nevada City ===
- James Parnell Powers (c. 1896)

=== Oakland ===
- Ayodele Nzinga (2021– )

=== Ojai ===
- Joan Raymund (inaugural, 2003)

=== Pacifica ===
- Rod Clark (2003-2013)
- Dorsetta Hale (2014-2017)
- Camincha Benvenutto (2018-2021)
- Toni Mirosevich (2022– )

=== Palm Desert ===
- Lori Davis (2023– )

=== Palm Springs ===
- C. Ronald Ellis (c. 1975)

=== Pleasanton ===
- Charlene Villella (1999–2000)
- Jim Ott (2001–2003)
- Kirk Ridgeway (2003–2005)
- Cynthia Bryant (2005–2007)
- Martha Meltzer (2007–2009)
- Deborah Grossman (2009–2011)
- Cynthia Bryant (2011–2012)
- Sandra Harrison Kay (2013–2015)

=== Point Arena ===
- Fionna Perkins (tenure ended upon her death in 2013)
- Blake More (2021– )

=== Pomona ===
- David Judah Oliver (2020–2021)
- Ceasar Avelar (2023– )

=== Rancho Mirage ===
- Dorothea Bisbas (2011– )

=== Richmond ===
- Dwayne Parish (2012–2014)
- Lincoln Bergman (2014–2016) (concurrent)
- Donté Clark (2014–2016) (concurrent)
- Brenda Quintanilla (2014–2016) (concurrent)
- Daniel Ari (2017–2019) (concurrent)
- Ciera-Jevai Gordon (2017–2019) (concurrent)
- Rob Lipton (2017–2019) (concurrent)
- David Flores (2021–2023)
- Stephen Sharpe (2023– )

=== Sacramento ===
- Dennis Schmitz and Viola Weinberg (2000–2002) (concurrent)
- José Montoya (2002–2004)
- Julia Connor (2005–2009)
- Bob Stanley (2009–2012)
- Jeff Knorr (2012–2015)
- Indigo Moor (2017–2019)
- Andru Defeye (2020–2024)

=== Salinas ===
- James B. Golden (2014–2018)

=== San Diego ===
- Ron Salisbury (2020–2021)
- Jason Magabo Perez (2023–2024)
- Paola Capó-García (2025- )

=== San Francisco ===
- Lawrence Ferlinghetti (inaugural; 1998–2000)
- Janice Mirikitani (2000–2002)
- Devorah Major (2002–2004)
- Jack Hirschman (2006–2008)
- Diane di Prima (2009–2011)
- Alejandro Murguía (2012–2015)
- Kim Shuck (2017–2021)
- Tongo Eisen-Martin (2021–2024)
- Genny Lim (2024– )

=== San Juan Capistrano ===
- Red Steagall (Cowboy Poet Laureate, 1992– )

=== San Ramon ===
- Patricia Perry (2006–2009)
- Elaine Betts (2010–2012)
- Kathy Moore (2012–2018)
- Jenyth Jo (2018–2024)
- Jaz Sufi (2024–2026)

=== Santa Barbara ===
- Barry Spacks (inaugural; 2005–2007)
- Perie Longo (2007–2009)
- David Starkey (2009–2011)
- Paul Willis (2011–2013)
- Chryss Yost (2013–2015)
- Sojourner Kincaid Rolle (2015–2017)
- Enid Osborn (2017–2019)
- Laure-Anne Bosselaar (2019–2021)
- Emma Trelles (2021–2023)
- Melinda Palacio (2023–2025)
- George Yatchisin (2025–2027)

=== Santa Monica ===
- Anne Carmack (2024– )

=== South Pasadena ===
- Ron Koertge (2018– )

=== Stockton ===
- Tama Brisbane (2015–2023)
- JazMarie LaTour (2023– )

=== Suisun City ===
- David "50th Excalibur" Camper (2023– )

=== Ukiah ===
- Armand Brint (2001–2004)
- Linda Noel (2004–2006)
- David Smith-Ferri (2006–2009)
- Theresa Whitehill (2009–2011)
- Dan Barte (2012–2014)
- Jabez Churchill (2014–2016)
- Michael Riedell (2016–2018)
- Roberta Werdinger (2018–2020)
- Melissa Eleftherion Carr (2021–2023)

=== Vallejo ===
- Genea Brice (2015–2017)
- D. L. Lang (2017–2019)
- Jeremy Snyder (2020–2023)
- Jacalyn Eyvonne and Kathleen Herrmann (concurrent, 2024–2025)
- Erik Manuel Soto (2026-2027)

=== Venice ===
- Philomene Long (2005–2007)

=== Watsonville ===
- Robert "Bob" Gómez (2022–2024)
- Victoria Bañales (2025–2027)

=== West Hollywood ===
- Steven Reigns (2014–2016)
- Kim Dower (2016–2018)
- Charles Flowers (2018–2020)
- Brian Sonia-Wallace (2020–2023)
- Jen Cheng (2023–2026)

=== Yucca Valley ===
- June LeMert Paxton (c. 1940s)

== Counties ==
=== Amador County ===
- Kat Everitt (2018–2020)
- Deja Douglas (2020–2022)
- Margaret Lewis (2023–2025)

=== Calaveras County ===
- Conrad Levasseur (2020–2022)
- Linda Toren (2022–2024)

=== El Dorado County ===
- Taylor Graham (2016–2018)
- Suzanne Roberts (2018–2020)
- Lara Gularte (2021–2023)
- Stephen Meadows (2023–2025)

=== Humboldt County ===
- Jim Dodge
- Jerry Martien

=== Kern County ===
- Don Thompson (2016–2019)
- Matthew Woodman (2019–2024)
- Samuel Rain Benjamin (2024–present)

=== Lake County ===
- Jim Lyle (1998–2002)
- James BlueWolf (2002–2004)
- Carolyn Wing Greenlee (2004–2006)
- Sandra Wade (2006–2008)
- Mary McMillan (2008–2010)
- Russell Gonzaga (2010–2012)
- Elaine Watt (2012–2014)
- Casey Carney (2014–2016)
- Julie Adams (2016–2018)
- Richard Schmidt (2018–2020)
- Georgina Marie Guardado (2020–2024)
- Brenda Yeager (2024–2026)

=== Lassen County ===
- Violet Stout (inaugural; 1991)

=== Marin County ===
- Albert Flynn DeSilver (2008–2010)
- Lyn Follett (2010–2013)
- Joe Zaccardi (2013–2015)
- Prartho Sereno (2015–2017)
- Rebecca Foust (2017–2019)
- Terry Lucas (2019–2021)
- Francesca Bell (2023–2025)

=== Mendocino County ===
- Devreaux Baker (2024– )

=== Monterey County ===
- Daniel B. Summerhill (2022–2023)
- Rachelle Escamilla (2024–2025)

=== Napa County ===
- Dorothy Lee Hansen (inaugural; 2002–2004)
- Beclee Wilson (2015–2017)
- Jeremy Benson (2017–2021)
- Marianne Lyon (2021–2023)
- Aisha Rivera (2023–2025)

=== Nevada County ===
- Molly Fisk (2017–2019)
- Chris Olander (2019–2021)
- Kirsten Casey (2022–2024)
- Karen Terrey (2025– )

=== Orange County ===
- Natalie J. Graham (2021–2023)
- Gustavo Hernandez (2024–2026)

=== San Luis Obispo County ===
- Ray Clark Dickson (1999)
- Glenna Luschei (2000)
- Hernan Castellano-Giron (2001)
- Anne Candelaria (2002)
- Kevin Patrick Sullivan (2003)
- Michael McLaughlin (2004)
- Jane Elsdon (2005)
- Gloria L. Velasquez (2006)
- Rosemary Wilvert (2007)
- Dian Sousa (2008)
- James Cushing (2009-2010)
- Bonnie Young (2011-2012)
- Jerry Douglas Smith (2013-2014)
- Marguerite Costigan (2015-2016)
- Jeanie Greensfelder (2017-2018)
- Ivan BrownOtter (2019)
- Kevin Clark (2019-2022)
- Caleb Nichols (2025– )

=== San Mateo County ===
- Caroline Goodwin (2014–2016)
- Lisa Rosenberg (2017–2018)
- Aileen Cassinetto (2019–2022)
- Jorge Argueta (2023–2024)
- Antonio López (2025– )

=== Santa Clara County ===
- Nils Peterson (2009–2011)
- Sally Ashton (2011–2013)
- David Perez (2014–2015)
- Arlene Biala (2016–2017)
- Mike McGee (2018–2019)
- Janice Sapigao (2020–2021)
- Tshaka Campbell (2022–2023)
- Yosimar Reyes (2024–2025)

=== Santa Cruz County ===
- Gary Young (2010–2011)
- David Swanger (2012–2013)
- Ellen Bass (2014–2015)
- Robert Sward (2016–2018)
- Danusha Laméris (2018–2020)
- David Sullivan (2021–2022)
- Farnaz Fatemi (2023–2024)
- Nancy Miller Gomez (2025–2026)

=== Sonoma County ===
- Don Emblen (2000-2001)
- David Bromige (2002-2003)
- Terry Ehret (2004–2006)
- Geri Digiorno (2006-2007)
- Mike Tuggle (2008-2009)
- Gwynn O'Gara (2010–2011)
- Bill Vartnaw (2012–2013)
- Katherine Hastings (2014–2016)
- Iris Dunkle (2017–2018)
- Maya Khosla (2018–2020)
- Phyllis Meshulam (2020–2022)
- Elizabeth C. Herron (2022–2024)
- Dave Seter (2024–2026)

=== Sutter County/Yuba County ===
- Jonathan Kinsman (2014–2018)
- Marcelo Hernandez Castillo (2020–2023)

=== Tulare County ===
- Wilma Elizabeth McDaniel (c. 1970s)

=== Ventura County ===
- Mary Kay Rummel (2014–2015)
- Phil Taggart (2016–2019)
- Luzmaria Espinosa (2020–2024)
- Mary Ann McFadden (2025— )

== See also ==
- California Poet Laureate
- List of U.S. state poets laureate
- United States Poet Laureate

== Notes ==
1.Eevelyn Mitchell's term as poet laureate was extended to a third year in August of 2022.
