= Sixteen Rivers Press =

- Founded: 1999
- Founder: Valerie Berry; Terry Ehret; Margaret Kaufman; Jacqueline Kudler; Diane Sher Lutovich; Carolyn Miller; Susan Sibbet
- Purpose: Poetry, Publishing
- Location: San Francisco, California
- Region served: San Francisco Bay Area
- Owner: Collective
- Employees: 16
- Website: www.sixteenrivers.org

Sixteen Rivers Press is a shared-work, nonprofit poetry collective that provides an alternative publishing avenue for San Francisco Bay Area poets.

== History ==
Founded in 1999 by poets Valerie Berry, Terry Ehret, Margaret Kaufman, Jacqueline Kudler, Diane Sher Lutovich, Carolyn Miller, and Susan Sibbet as a shared-work, nonprofit poetry collective dedicated to providing an alternative publishing avenue for San Francisco Bay Area poets.Sixteen Rivers Press was modeled after the Alice James Books collective, a Boston-area regional press created in the 1970s. Named for the sixteen rivers that flow into San Francisco Bay, the press publishes books by poets residing in the Greater Bay Area region.

Sixteen Rivers Press continues as one of the longest-running and most successful collective presses in the United States, having published over sixty collections of poetry. Its authors have won prizes in poetry and translation, National Endowment for the Arts and other grants, honors in various genres, and have published books with other presses—in poetry, fiction, architecture, education, psychology, and other nonfiction.

== Press operations ==
=== Editorial structure ===
Sixteen Rivers Press chooses manuscripts via an annual “blind” selection competition, the collective's membership participating in that selection. Poets whose manuscripts are chosen for book publication commit to working with the press for a term of three years, their book appearing during the second year of that term. Many writers have chosen to stay active in the press past the requisite three-year term.

Although the press operates with a nonprofit board, it uses a consensus model of decision-making.

=== Funding ===
Sixteen Rivers Press is a US 501(c)(3) not-for-profit corporation. The press employs no paid staff. Money to publish new books comes primarily from sales of the previous year's books, augmented by donations, grants, and fundraisers.

Since 2005, through the generosity of particular supporters and featured poets, Sixteen Rivers has held annual fundraiser evenings. Featured poets at those fundraisers have been Philip Levine, Eavan Boland, Al Young, Ilya Kaminsky, Brenda Hillman, Robert Hass, Jane Hirshfield, Mark Doty, Kay Ryan, and Camille Dungy.

In 2009 and 2012, Sixteen Rivers Press was recognized by the National Endowment for the Arts with Access to Artistic Excellence grants. Grants have also come from The Koret Foundation, The Whitney Foundation, Yellow House Foundation, and others.

=== Special projects ===
In 2007, Sixteen Rivers Press released a CD, Naming the Rivers, featuring poetry read by poets published by the press prior to that year.

In 2009, Sixteen Rivers Press released The Place That Inhabits Us, a wide-ranging anthology of poems by non-members that explores different aspects of life within the San Francisco Bay Area and that area's effect on poets’ lives and consciousness. Former United States Poet Laureate Robert Hass wrote the foreword to the volume.

In 2011, Sixteen Rivers Press initiated its Under Forty chapbook series, a publication competition for writers under the age of forty. The first chapbook selected was Judy Halebsky’s Space/Gap/Interval/Distance. The second was Miriam Bird Greenberg's All night in the new country.

In 2013, Sixteen Rivers Press published its first book of translations, I Know/Je Sais by French writer Ito Naga, translated by the author and press member Lynne Knight.

In 2018, Sixteen Rivers Press published the anthology America We Call Your Name: Poems of Resistance and Resilience, a response to the 2016 presidential election combining the voices of poets from across America with poets from other countries and other times, with a foreword by Camille Dungy.

== Members ==
=== Nonprofit Board Members ===
Current Sixteen Rivers Press Nonprofit Board Members include Dane Cervine, Terry Ehret, Margaret Kaufman, and Carolyn Miller.

=== Advisory board members ===
Current Sixteen Rivers Press Advisory Board members include Kazim Ali, Gillian Conoley, Camille T. Dungy, Ruth Gundle, Lee Herrick, Brenda Hillman, Jane Hirshfield, Marie Howe, Joyce Jenkins, Kay Ryan, David St. John, Eleanor Wilner, Maw Shein Win, and Matthew Zapruder.

=== Collective Members ===
Current active Sixteen Rivers Press collective members include Valerie Berry, Barbara Swift Brauer, Patrick Cahill, Dane Cervine, Terry Ehret, Gerald Fleming, Margaret Kaufman, Lynne Knight, Bonnie Wai-Lee Kwong, Christina Lloyd, Moira Magneson, Carolyn Miller, Matthew M. Monte, Camille Norton, Eliot Schain, Murray Silverstein, Alice Templeton, Helen Wickes, and Joseph Zaccardi.

== Book sales ==
Sixteen Rivers Press titles are available from the press itself, online outlets in the United States and internationally, and traditional bookstores. Ebooks are produced and distributed by Stillpoint Digital Press.

== Titles ==
- Sixteen Rivers Press (eds.), America, We Call Your Name: Poems of Resistance and Resilience, Foreword by Camille T. Dungy, 2018, ISBN 978-1939639165
- Sixteen Rivers Press (eds.), The Place That Inhabits Us: Poems of the San Francisco Bay Watershed, Foreword by Robert Hass, April 2010, ISBN 978-0-9819816-1-1
- Sixteen Rivers Press, Naming the Rivers: Poets of Sixteen Rivers Press 1999-2008. Features the recordings of sixteen Sixteen Rivers Press authors reading their own work
- Dan Bellm, Practice, 2008, ISBN 978-0-9767642-5-0; ebook edition, 2012
- Maria M. Benet, Mapmaker of Absences, 2005, ISBN 0-9707370-8-4
- Stella Beratlis, Alkali Sink, 2015, ISBN 978-1939639066
- Valerie Berry, difficult news, 2001, ISBN 0-9707370-0-9
- Barbara Swift Brauer, 2013, At Ease in the Borrowed World, ISBN 978-0-9819816-8-0
- Beverly Burch, 2014, How a Mirage Works, ISBN 978-1-939639-04-2
- Terry Ehret, Lucky Break, 2008, ISBN 978-0-9767642-6-7
- Terry Ehret, Translations From the Human Language, 2001, ISBN 0-9707370-1-7
- Gerald Fleming, The Choreographer, 2013, ISBN 978-0-9819816-7-3
- Gerald Fleming, Swimmer Climbing onto Shore, 2005, ISBN 0-9707370-9-2
- Miriam Bird Greenberg, All night in the new country, 2013, ISBN 978-1-9396390-2-8
- Judy Halebsky, Space/Gap/Interval/Distance, 2012, ISBN 978-0-9819816-5-9; ebook edition, 2012
- Christina Hutchins, The Stranger Dissolves, 2011, ISBN 978-0-9819816-2-8; ebook edition, 2012
- Margaret Kaufman, Inheritance, April 2010, ISBN 978-0-9819816-0-4
- Margaret Kaufman, Snake at the Wrist, 2002, ISBN 0-9707370-2-5
- Lynne Knight, Again, 2009, ISBN 978-0-9767642-8-1
- Jacqueline Kudler, Easing into Dark, 2012, ISBN 978-0-9819816-4-2; ebook edition, 2012
- Jacqueline Kudler, Sacred Precinct, 2003, ISBN 0-9707370-4-1; ebook edition, 2012
- Nina Lindsay, Today’s Special, 2007, ISBN 978-0-9767642-3-6
- Diane Sher Lutovich, In the Right Season, 2005, ISBN 0-9767642-0-2
- Diane Sher Lutovich, What I Stole, 2003, ISBN 0-9707370-5-X
- Carolyn Miller, Light, Moving, 2009, ISBN 978-0-9767642-9-8
- Carolyn Miller, After Cocteau, 2002, ISBN 0-9707370-3-3
- Sharon Olson, The Long Night of Flying, 2006, ISBN 0-9767642-1-0
- Lisa Robertson, Orbit of Known Objects, 2015, ISBN 978-1939639073
- Susan Sibbet, No Easy Light, 2004, ISBN 0-9707370-6-8
- Murray Silverstein, Any Old Wolf, 2006, ISBN 0-9767642-2-9
- Murray Silverstein, Master of Leaves, 2014, ISBN 978-1-939639-05-9
- Lynn Lyman Trombetta, Falling World, 2004, ISBN 0-9707370-7-6
- Jeanne Wagner, In the Body of Our Lives, 2011, ISBN 978-0-9819816-3-5
- Gillian Wegener, The Opposite of Clairvoyance, 2008, ISBN 978-0-9767642-7-4
- Helen Wickes, In Search of Landscape, 2007, ISBN 978-0-9767642-4-3
- Helen Wickes, World as You Left It, 2015, ISBN 978-1939639080
