= Joel Fallon =

American poet (1931-2016)

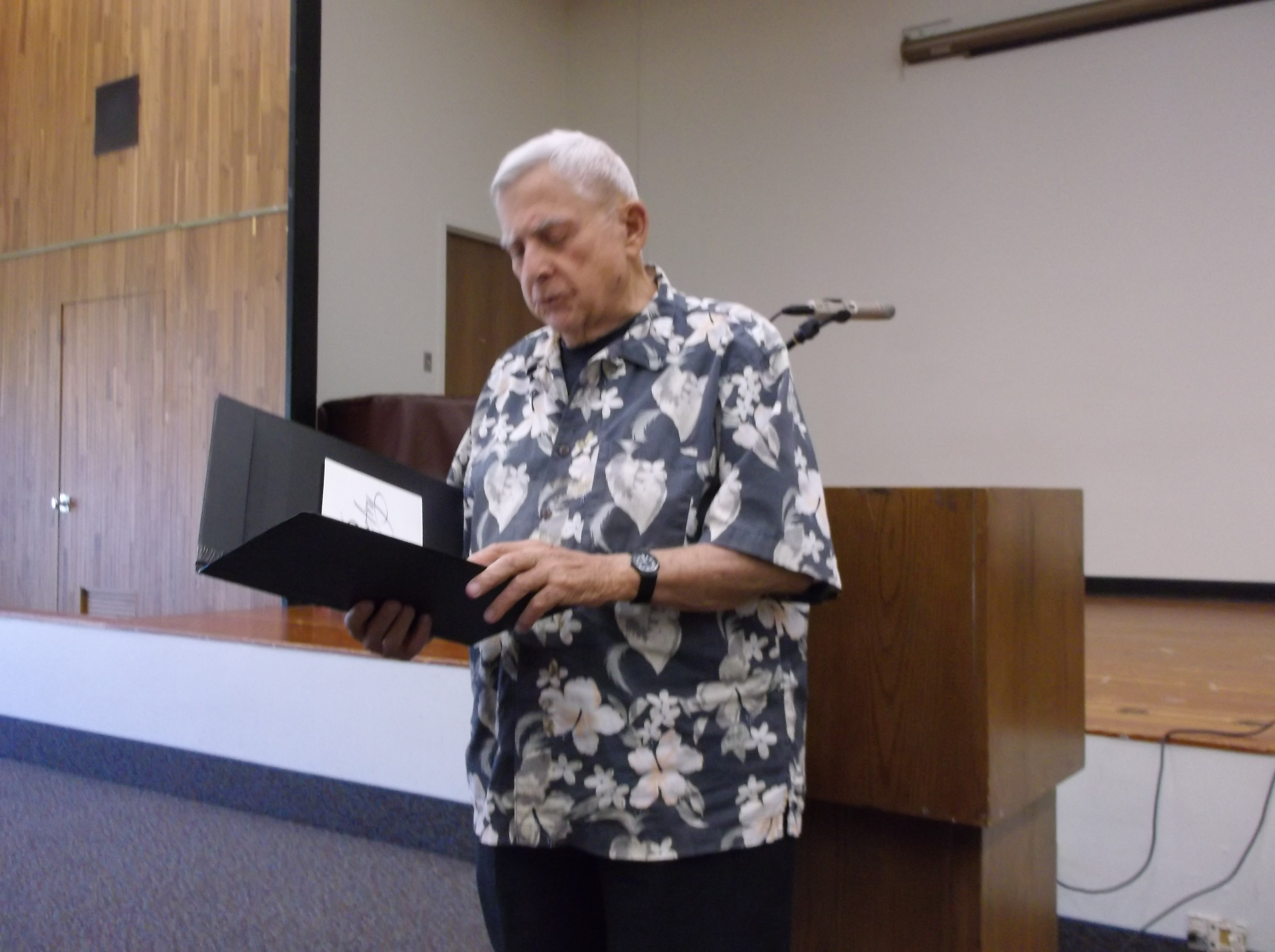
- Benicia Poet Laureate Joel Fallon
- Born: June 16, 1931
- Died: August 11, 2016 (aged 85)
- Occupations: Poet laureate of Benicia, California

Joel Fallon (June 16, 1931 – August 11, 2016) was the first Poet laureate of Benicia, California. He is the namesake of the Joel Fallon poetry scholarship awarded annually since 2015 to high school students in Benicia, California. He was a founding member of the Benicia First Tuesday Poets, which meets at the Benicia Library monthly since 2003, and also helped begin the Benicia Love Poetry Contest and the annual Poets’ Picnic. He was named Benicia's first poet laureate in 2005. He helped Genea Brice advocate for a poet laureate program in neighboring Vallejo, California. He also served as a vice president of Arts Benicia. Fallon began writing poetry while serving overseas in the United States Army. He was influenced by Robert Frost, Emily Dickinson, and Charles Bukowski.

== Works ==
=== Collections ===
- Peery, Don, ed. The Book of Joel (Benicia Literary Arts, 2019)

=== Chapbooks ===
- Apple Wind
- A Gathering of Angels
- Clean Sheets, Dirty Woman
- Shanghai Wilson

=== Albums ===
- Fallon Reads Fallon (2010)

== See also ==
- Robert Shelby
- List of municipal poets laureate in California
