= Jacalyn Eyvonne =

American poet

- Education: Academy of Art University at San Francisco
- Occupation: Poet
- Title: Poet laureate of Vallejo, California
- Term: 2024–2025
- Predecessor: Jeremy Snyder
- Writing career
- Genre: poetry

Jacalyn Evone Robinson known professionally as Jacalyn Eyvonne is an African-American poet and filmmaker. She served concurrently with Kathleen Herrmann as poet laureate of Vallejo, California.

== Writing ==
Jacalyn Eyvonne is the author of 3 books, and her poems have appeared in anthologies in North America and the United Kingdom. In 2022 she placed second in the Jackson Book Festival poetry competition. In the 1990s she edited the magazine In the Company of Poets based in Oakland, California. Eyvonne is influenced by the work of Gwendolyn Brooks, Maya Angelou, and Nikki Giovanni.

=== Vallejo Poet Laureate (2024–2025) ===
Eyvonne served concurrently with Kathleen Herrmann as poet laureate of Vallejo, California from January 1, 2024 to December 31, 2025. Like their predecessors, Herrmann and Eyvonne hosted the Poetry in Notion poetry circle at the John F. Kennedy Library in Vallejo. The pair also launched a new poetry open mic series called Tea House Poetry that met at the Integrity cafe.

The co-poets laureate published a youth anthology in cooperation with the Vallejo Unified School District entitled Youth Poetry Letters - Pencils and Dreams: Young Vallejo Poets Share Their World in 2024. They held events for youth including a chalk art festival and literacy awareness night. Eyvonne and Herrmann coached students for the 2025 Poetry Out Loud performance competition.

Since being named poet laureate, Jacalyn Eyvonne has performed at the 2023 Mad Hatter Holiday Festival, a Black History Month event at the Vallejo Naval and Historical Museum, Art Walk, Alibi Bookshop, the Earth Daze Festival, at a climate change themed art exhibit at Vallejo Art Lofts Gallery, on the Vallejo waterfront, the Solano County Fair, a Black History Month event at the Vallejo library, with fellow poets laureate at the Fairfield Library, and at a Juneteenth flag raising ceremony. Eyvonne and Herrmann hosted an event at the Empress Theater encouraging voting. They organized an ekphrastic poetry reading at Mare Island Art Studios. Eyvonne also performed at the No Kings demonstration in Vallejo.

In 2025 the poets laureate of Vallejo celebrated the 10th anniversary of the poet laureate program. All five Vallejo poets laureate received recognition from the California State Legislature, Solano County Supervisors, Vallejo Mayor and City Council for their service upon the program's anniversary. A sampling of their work was also included in the anthology A Decade of Poetic Unity edited by D. L. Lang. Eyvonne and Herrmann served on the selection committee that chose Erik Manuel Soto as their successor.

=== 2026–present ===
Jacalyn Eyvonne continues to stay active in the Vallejo poetry and film scene, hosting the annual Monologues and Poetry Film Festival, and performing in 2026 at the Black History Month Block Party, Voices at the Table, Red Man's Hall, the Vacaville Museum, and Temple Art Lofts Juneteenth exhibit..

== Filmmaking ==
Eyvonne earned her B.A. in Motion Pictures & Television from the Academy of Art University at San Francisco. She is a television producer at Vallejo Community Access Television, and the station awarded her film Arc Angels with Best Feature in 2018. Eyvonne is the founder of the Poetry and Monologues and KidsNFilm film festivals. On February 13, 2017, she was honored by the Indiana House of Representatives in Indiana House Resolution 18 for her film Stripes when it appeared at the Bill Johnson Black Film Festival. She served as a judge for the 2017 North Bay Art & Film Festival. Eyvonne has also worked as a playwright and realtor.

== Works ==
=== Books ===
- Strange Things Happen At Midnight: Murder, Suspense, and Short Weird Tales, JE Books. 2020. ISBN 9781735493626
- I Am Not An Inconsequential Word: Poetry & Remnants JE Books. 2022. ISBN 9781735493633
- Venting To Verse: How To Turn Anger Into Poetry JE Books. 2023. ISBN 9781735493664
- The Unyielding Weight of Words: Poems for Reflection, Healing, and Love Soulstanzas Books. 2024. ISBN 9798989505005

=== Poems ===
- Robinson, Jacalyn, “It’s Magic!” Oakland Tribune, November 12, 1991, pg D-2
- Eyvonne, Jacalyn, "Rise and Shine," Vallejo Weekly Vol. 12, No. 10, March 8, 2024

=== Anthologies ===
==== Editor ====
- Youth Poetry Letters - Pencils and Dreams: Young Vallejo Poets Share Their World Youth Poetry Letters. 2024. ISBN 9781735493688
- A New Season: Poems for a World in Flux Seasonal Bliss Publication. 2026. ISBN 9798989505036

==== Contributor ====
- Sistah’s With Ink Voices, CreateSpace, 2013, ISBN 9781491087503
- Wheelsong Poetry Anthology 3, Wheelsong Books, United Kingdom, 2023, ISBN 9798860877658
- Holes: An Anthology of Poems about Depths, Darkness, and Desire JLRB Press. 2024. ISBN 9781738894963
- World Healing, World Peace 2024 Inner Child Press. 2024. ISBN 9781961498235
- Wheelsong Poetry Anthology 4, Wheelsong Books, United Kingdom, 2024, ISBN 9798323753000
- A poetic field filled with Wildwood Flowers: An anthology of poetry and prose 2024. ISBN 9798864490204
- Rituals: Summer 2024. Anomaly. 2024. ISBN 9798328315364
- Screaming at America! An anthology of Dissent 2024. ISBN 9781304408112
- Hues of Spring: A Festival of Colours, Volume 2 NYRA Publishers. 2024. ISBN 9788197099656
- A Decade of Poetic Unity: Celebrating Vallejo's Poets Laureate 2025. ISBN 9798328345736
- Orange is not a Colour: Poems Against Totalitarianism Like a Blot from the Blue. 2025. ISBN 9781300302674
- Riders on the Storm Revolutionary Poets Brigade of San Francisco. 2025. ISBN 9780938392194
- Depose Vagabond Books. 2025. ISBN 9781958307083
- Remembering Langston Hughes Moonstone Arts Center. 2026. ISBN 9781970590098

== See also ==
- Genea Brice
- D. L. Lang
- Jeremy Snyder
- Erik Manuel Soto
- List of municipal poets laureate in California
