= Mary Susan =

Mary Susan is a feminine given name. Notable people with the name include:

- Mary Susan Applegate (born 1955), American songwriter, poet, and lyricist
- Mary Susan Etherington (1864–1942), English singer and comic actress known professionally as Marie Tempest
- Mary Susan Gast (born 1945), American poet
- Mary Susan McIntosh (1936–2013), British sociologist, feminist, political activist, and campaigner for lesbian and gay rights in the UK
