= Bosselaar =

Bosselaar is a surname. Notable people with the surname include:

- Laure-Anne Bosselaar (born 1943), Belgian-American poet, translator and professor
- Tinus Bosselaar (1936–2018), Dutch footballer
