= Kathleen Herrmann =

American poet

- Education: St. Mary's College of California
- Occupation: Poet
- Title: Poet laureate of Vallejo, California
- Term: 2024-2025
- Predecessor: Jeremy Snyder
- Successor: Erik Manuel Soto
- Writing career
- Genre: poetry

Kathleen Herrmann is an American poet. She served concurrently with Jacalyn Eyvonne as poet laureate of Vallejo, California. Herrmann is a retired teacher with an M.A. in Teaching Leadership from St. Mary's College of California and a B.A. in English Literature from University of California Berkeley. Herrmann is also a singer, pianist, guitarist, and ukulele player.

== Writing ==
Kathleen Herrmann's poetry has been published in anthologies in Africa, Australia, and North America, and in the Benicia Herald newspaper. She received awards in poetry from the Solano County Fair and Ina Coolbrith Poetry Circle. Herrmann performed for the Flyway Festival, Vallejo Poetry Festival, Napa Valley Writers Club, Alameda Island Poets, the American Association of University Women, Benicia First Tuesday Poets, Poetry by the Bay, and KZCT.

=== Vallejo Poet Laureate (2024-2025) ===
Herrmann served concurrently with Jacalyn Eyvonne as poet laureate of Vallejo, California from January 1, 2024 to December 31, 2025. In 2024 as poet laureate, Herrmann performed at the Mad Hatter Holiday Festival, a Martin Luther King Day event, a Black History Month event, Fiestas Primavera in Benicia, Art Walk, Alibi Bookshop, the Earth Daze Festival, a climate change themed art exhibit at Vallejo Art Lofts Gallery, on the Vallejo waterfront, and the Solano County Fair. Eyvonne and Herrmann hosted an event at the Empress Theater encouraging voting.

Like their predecessors, Herrmann and Eyvonne hosted the Poetry in Notion poetry circle at the John F. Kennedy Library in Vallejo. Founded in 2015 by Genea Brice Poetry in Notion's in-person meetings were cancelled in 2020 due to restrictions on public gatherings during the COVID-19 pandemic. The pair also launched a new poetry open mic series called Tea House Poetry that met at the Integrity cafe.

The co-poets laureate published a youth anthology in cooperation with the Vallejo Unified School District entitled Youth Poetry Letters - Pencils and Dreams: Young Vallejo Poets Share Their World in 2024. They held events for youth including a chalk art festival and literacy awareness night. Eyvonne and Herrmann coached students for the 2025 Poetry Out Loud performance competition. They organized an ekphrastic poetry reading at Mare Island Art Studios. In 2025 Herrmann performed with jazz accompaniment at the Mira Theater. She performed at the Poets to Padilla and Schiff: Let Gaza Live demonstration in San Francisco in support of Palestinian journalists and H.R. 3565, the Block the Bombs Act.

In 2025 the poets laureate of Vallejo celebrated the 10th anniversary of the poet laureate program. All five Vallejo poets laureate received recognition from the California State Legislature, Solano County Supervisors, Vallejo Mayor and City Council for their service upon the program's anniversary. A sampling of their work was also included in the anthology A Decade of Poetic Unity edited by D. L. Lang. Eyvonne and Herrmann served on the selection committee that chose Erik Manuel Soto as their successor.

== Works ==
=== Poems ===
- Herrmann, Kathleen, "A Perfect Day" Benicia Herald, April 22, 2020
- Herrmann, Kathleen, "Day 47" Benicia Herald, May 17, 2020
- Herrmann, Kathleen, "Say Her Name" Benicia Herald, July 24, 2020
- Herrmann, Kathleen, "Icarus In The 21st Century" Benicia Herald, September 6, 2020
- Herrmann, Kathleen, "Spellbound" Benicia Herald, September 25, 2020
- Herrmann, Kathleen, "Freefall" Benicia Herald, October 28, 2020
- Herrmann, Kathleen, "High Hopes" Benicia Herald, January 15, 2021
- Herrmann, Kathleen, "Say it LOUD" Benicia Herald, April 28, 2021
- Herrmann, Kathleen, "Unwanted" Benicia Herald, September 22, 2021
- Herrmann, Kathleen, "High Hopes Revisited January 6, 2022" Benicia Herald, January 14, 2022
- Herrmann, Kathleen, "The Day I Met Homer Smith at the Movies" Benicia Herald, February 16, 2022
- Herrmann, Kathleen, "Believe" Benicia Herald, March 9, 2022
- Herrmann, Kathleen, "Amelia’s Song" Benicia Herald, May 1, 2022
- Herrmann, Kathleen, "A Woman's Work" Work & The Anthropocene, Ice Floe Press, September 2, 2022
- Herrmann, Kathleen, "The Day Lahaina Burned" Benicia Herald, September 6, 2023
- Herrmann, Kathleen, "Resolve" Benicia Herald, January 12, 2024
- Herrmann, Kathleen, “Elmira” Benicia Herald, February 25, 2024
- Herrmann, Kathleen, "Say it LOUD" Vallejo Weekly, Vol. 12, No. 10, March 8, 2024
- Herrmann, Kathleen, “Polar Wolf” Benicia Herald, April 5, 2024
- Herrmann, Kathleen, “Planet vs. Plastics” Benicia Herald, April 28, 2024
- Herrmann, Kathleen, “Bright Yellow Daffodils” Benicia Herald, March 14, 2025
- Herrmann, Kathleen, “Fire Season” Benicia Herald, July 18, 2025
- Herrmann, Kathleen, "Gaza Is Burning" Benicia Herald, September 21, 2025

=== Anthologies ===
==== Editor ====
- Youth Poetry Letters - Pencils and Dreams: Young Vallejo Poets Share Their World Youth Poetry Letters. 2024. ISBN 9781735493688
- A New Season: Poems for a World in Flux Seasonal Bliss Publication. 2026. ISBN 9798989505036

==== Contributor ====
- Musings During A Time of Pandemic Kistrech Poetry Festival. 2020. ISBN 9789966955951
- Liberté, Égalité, Fraternité Moonstone Press. 2021. ISBN 9781954499201
- I Can’t Breathe: A Poetic Anthology of Social Justice Kistrech Poetry Festival. 2021. ISBN 9789914988505
- Friendship: Lifespan Vol. 3 Pure Slush Books. 2021. ISBN 9781922427243
- Third Harvest: Napa Valley Writers Club 2021 Gnarly Vine Press. 2021. ISBN 9780998510835
- Yearning to Breathe Free: A Community Journal of 2020 Benicia Literary Arts. 2022. ISBN 9781735499925
- Post-Roe Alternatives: Fighting Back B Cubed Press. 2022. ISBN 9781949476316
- Support Ukraine Moonstone Press. 2022. ISBN 9781954499690
- Nooks and Crannies Benicia Literary Arts. 2022. ISBN 9781735499918
- Coming Out of Isolation Kistrech Poetry Festival. 2022. ISBN 9783947911738
- Opus IV: Napa Valley Writers Club 2023 Gnarly Vine Press. 2023. ISBN 9780998510828
- Loss: Lifespan, Vol. 9 Pure Slush Books. 2024. ISBN 9781922427366
- Unsettled Benicia Literary Arts. 2024. ISBN 9781735499963
- All About Animals Poetic Edge Publishers. 2024. ISBN 9781917408011
- Freedom 2024 Moonstone Arts Center. 2024.
- Our State of the Union: Your Voice Matters Moonstone Arts Center. 2024.
- A Decade of Poetic Unity: Celebrating Vallejo's Poets Laureate 2025. ISBN 9798328345736

== See also ==
- Genea Brice
- D. L. Lang
- Jeremy Snyder
- Erik Manuel Soto
- List of municipal poets laureate in California
