= Jacqueline Kudler =

American poet (1935–2024)

Jacqueline Kudler (May 28, 1935 – June 13, 2024) was an American poet and educator who lived in Sausalito, California.

Kudler died on June 13, 2024, at the age of 89.

== Writing ==
In 1999, Kudler helped to found Sixteen Rivers Press, a poetry-publishing collective of which she remains a member. Her first collection of poetry, The Sacred Precinct (ISBN 9780970737045), was published in 2004. Easing Into Dark (ISBN 9780981981642), her second volume, came out in 2012. Sixteen Rivers Press released her third and final collection, Ripenings (ISBN 9781939639356) posthumously in 2024.

For many years she wrote hiking columns with her sister, Arlene Stark, that appeared in the Pacific Sun. A collection of their hikes, Walking from Inn to Inn (ISBN 978-0887420689), was published in 1986.

The Marin Poetry Center awarded her its first Calliope Award for Lifetime Achievement in June, 2010.

== Teaching ==
She helped to found North Bay School in 1971, and taught language arts there until 1982.

She taught writing and literature at College of Marin starting in 1985.
