= Diane Sher Lutovich =

American poet

Diane Sher Lutovich (died June 2, 2004) was an American poet, and writing teacher. She was a founding member of Sixteen Rivers Press, a publishing collective based in Northern California. She was a native of Hibbing, Minnesota.

== Awards ==
- 2004 American Book Award

== Works ==
- "It’s About Time", "Power of the Ephemeral", Sixteen Rivers Press
- What I stole. Sixteen Rivers Press. 2003. ISBN 978-0-9707370-5-2.
- In the right season. Sixteen Rivers Press. 2005. ISBN 978-0-9767642-0-5.
- Nobody's Child. Baywood Pub Co. 2001. ISBN 978-0-89503-253-9.
- Nobody's child: how older women say good-bye to their mothers. Baywood Pub. Co. 2002. ISBN 978-0-89503-253-9.

=== Non-fiction ===
- Janis Fisher Chan; Diane Lutovich (1997). Professional writing skills: a self-paced training program. Write It Well. ISBN 978-0-9637455-4-5.
- Diane Lutovich; Janis Fisher Chan (1999). Just Commas. Write It Well. ISBN 978-0-9637455-6-9.
- Diane Lutovich; Janis Fisher Chan (1998). How to Write Reports and Proposals: A Self-Paced Training Program. Write It Well. ISBN 978-0-9637455-5-2.
- Janis Fisher Chan; Diane Lutovich (2003). Grammar for Grownups: A Self-Paced Training Program. Write It Well. ISBN 978-0-9637455-7-6.
- Janis Fisher Chan; Diane Lutovich (1994). Writing Performance Documentation: A Self-Paced Training Program. Write It Well. ISBN 978-0-9637455-3-8.

=== Anthologies ===
- David St. John; Morley Clark, eds. (2005). Cloud view poets: an anthology. Arctos Press. ISBN 978-0-9725384-4-2.
- June Cotner, ed. (2001). Mothers and daughters: a poetry celebration. Harmony Books. ISBN 978-0-609-60689-6.
