= Donté Clark =

American poet

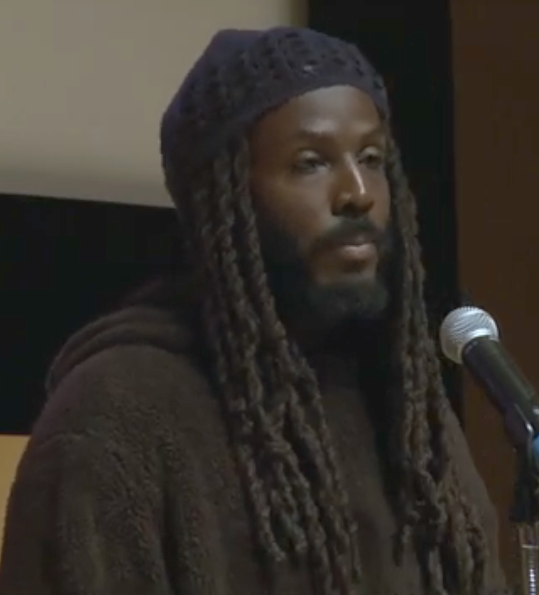
- Performing at the San Francisco Public Library in 2023
- Occupations: Poet, actor, activist

Donté Clark is a poet, actor, and community activist from unincorporated North Richmond, California who works with youth organizations throughout the Richmond area.

As a student in high school, Clark was recruited by his English teacher Molly Raynor who was founding a youth arts program, RAW Talent. Clark became the artistic lead of the program's first play, Té's Harmony, which examined local issues through the structure of Romeo and Juliet. The performance was introduced by poet Luis J. Rodriguez. The 2015 documentary Romeo Is Bleeding follows Clark in the process of writing and performing Té's Harmony.

In July 2014, Donté Clark and two others, Lincoln Bergman and Brenda Quintanilla, were made poets laureate of Richmond for a two year period. They were preceded as poet laureate by Dwayne Parish, and succeeded by Daniel Ari, Ciera-Jevai Gordon and Rob Lipton.

Clark's mentoring of the community's youth has led to some becoming mentors and teachers themselves, including poet and actor DeAndre Evans who appeared with Clark and Will Hartfield reciting poetry for a PBS story about housing in Richmond.

Clark has a supporting role in the 2016 film Kicks, the 2018 film Code Switch, and stars in the web series The North Pole.

Clark debuted a short film, Blú Honey, in 2026. The script was written in poetry; Clark said, "I want the poets to be able to see themselves. Like, 'Oh okay, so not only could I do slam poetry and write books, but I could write a movie too.'"

== Collections ==
- KNOWFREEDOM (2018, self-published on CreateSpace)
- We Cry Freedom (F&M Publishing)

== See also ==
- List of municipal poets laureate in California
