= Dwayne Parish =

American poet

Dwayne Parish is an American poet. He was born in Fairfield, California on Travis Air Force Base and grew up in Vallejo, California. He moved to Richmond in 1992. At age 55, he was named the first poet laureate of Richmond, California in 2012. He prefers to write in the acrostic form. Parish also served on the Richmond Arts & Culture Commission. Parish was succeeded as poet laureate by Donté Clark, Lincoln Bergman, and Brendan Quintanilla, who served concurrently.

== See also ==
- List of municipal poets laureate in California
