= Robert Shelby (poet) =

American poet

Robert M. Shelby was an American poet (November 3, 1935 Joplin, Missouri - March 15, 2016, Benicia, California). He served as the poet laureate of Benicia, California from 2008 to 2010.

Born in Joplin, Missouri, Shelby grew up in Los Angeles, California. After serving in the United States Naval Reserve, he attended the University of California, Berkeley, and moved to Benicia in 2002. He published many poetry books including Leaves Away, Quick Americana, The Thousand Story Pagoda, Woman in a White Cap, Flying Apples, Falling Parasols, Music From The Bones, Quick Orientalia, and Raining Down Dogs, Bouncing Up Cats, And A Few Birds

== See also ==
- Joel Fallon
- List of municipal poets laureate in California
