= Connie Post =

American poet

Connie Post is an American poet. She served as the first poet laureate of Livermore, California, from 2005 to 2009. She hosted multiple poetry shows including Wine and Words, Ravenswood, and Valona Deli Second Sunday Poetry Series. Post is widely published and the author of seven books of poetry. She was the recipient of over 70 poetry awards, including the 2014 Lyrebird Award, 2012 Aurorean Editor's chapbook prize, 2018 Liakoura Award, the Caesura Award, and the 2016 Crab Creek Poetry Award. She was succeeded as poet laureate by Cher Wollard, Kevin Gunn, Cynthia Patton, Peggy Schimmelman, and Faith Alpher.

== Works ==
=== Collections ===
- Prime Meridian (Glass Lyre Press, 2020)
- Floodwater (Glass Lyre Press, 2014)

=== Chapbooks ===
- And When the Sun Drops (Finishing Line Press, 2012)
- Trip Wires (Finishing Line Press, 2010)

== See also ==
- List of municipal poets laureate in California
