= Christina Hutchins =

American poet

Christina Hutchins is an American poet. She was the first poet laureate of Albany, California from 2008 to 2012. She has won several awards for her poetry, including The Missouri Review Editors Prize, National Poetry Review's Finch Prize, and a Summer Literary Seminar in St. Petersburg, Russia. Her second book Tender the Maker won the 2015 May Swenson Poetry Award, and her chapbook Radiantly We Inhabit the Air won the 2011 Robin Becker Prize. In 2017 she became a Dartmouth Poet in Residence, and she lived in Robert Frost's home in Franconia, New Hampshire. Hutchins was born in 1961 in San Jose, California and educated at University of California, Davis (BS Biochemistry and Piano Performance), Harvard University(MDiv, 1991), and holds a Ph.D. in Interdisciplinary Studies: Process Philosophy and Poetry from the Graduate Theological Union. She taught master's students for 18 years at Pacific School of Religion as Lecturer in Theology and Literary Arts. She is also an ordained minister in the Congregational/United Church of Christ.

== Works ==
=== Collections ===
- Tender the Maker Utah State University Press (2015)
- The Stranger Dissolves Sixteen Rivers Press (2011)

=== Chapbooks ===
- Radiantly We Inhabit the Air Seven Kitchens Press (2011)
- Collecting Light Acacia Books (1999)

== See also ==
- List of municipal poets laureate in California
