= Romeo Is Bleeding (2015 film) =

- San Francisco International Film Festival poster
- Directed by: Jason Zeldes
- Produced by: Michael Klein
- Cinematography: Rajiv Smith-Mahabir
- Edited by: Jason Zeldes; Kevin Klauber
- Release date: April 29, 2015
- Running time: 93 minutes
- Country: United States
- Language: English

Romeo Is Bleeding is a 2015 documentary film directed by Jason Zeldes focusing on poets and students of Richmond, California as they prepare an adaptation of Romeo and Juliet based on the decades-long violent conflict between the neighborhoods of North and Central Richmond. The film explores the sources of this conflict and includes voices from citizens, city government, and the Richmond police department.

The primary focus of the film is poet Donté Clark. It premiered April 29, 2015 as part of the San Francisco International Film Festival at the El Cerrito High School theater where the play, Té's Harmony, was originally staged. The Mercury News, in an article about the festival, called Romeo Is Bleeding "one of the best in the bunch."
