= Maw Shein Win =

Burmese American poet

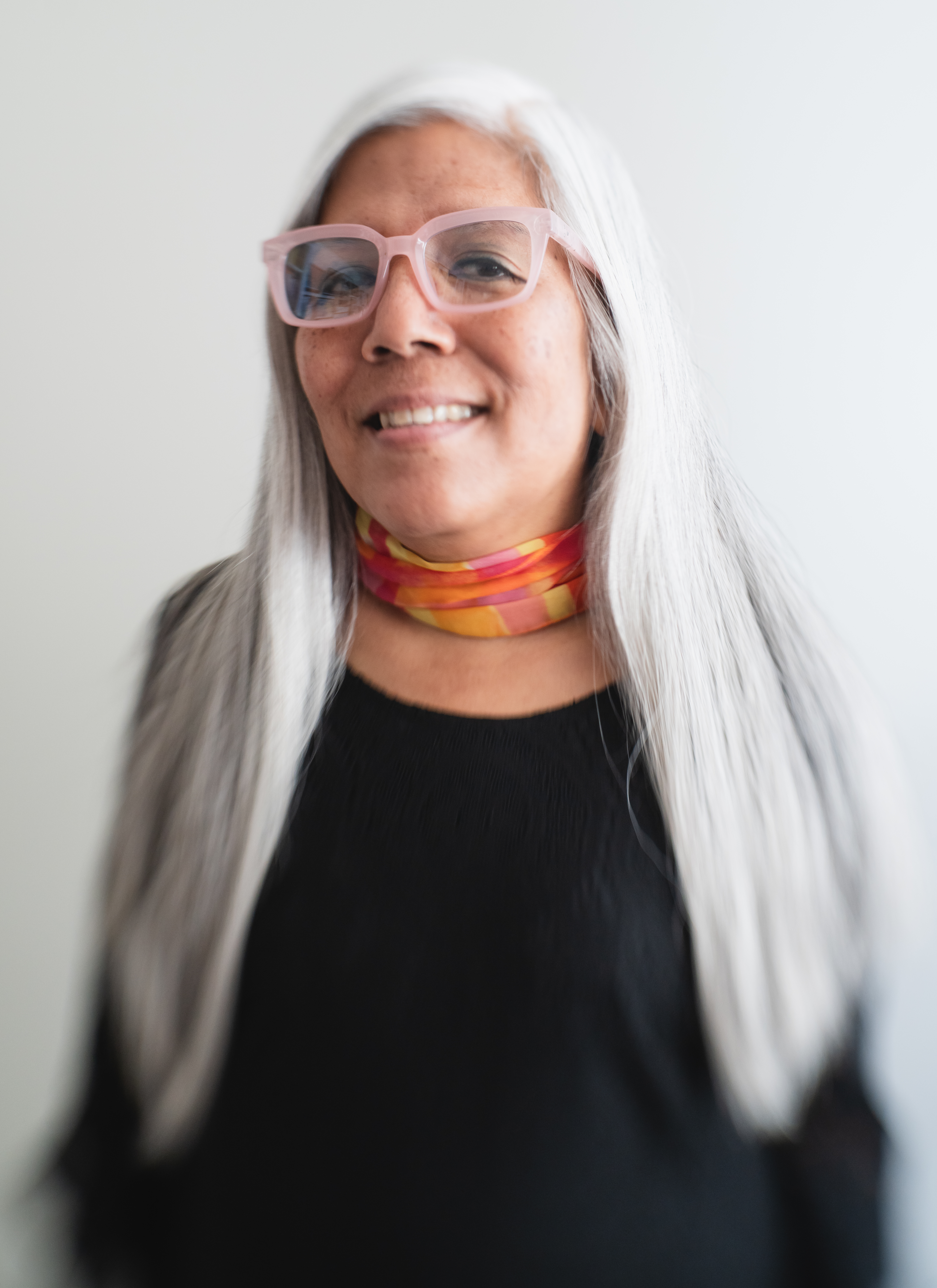
Maw Shein Win

Maw Shein Win is a Burmese American poet who lives and teaches in the San Francisco Bay Area. She served as the inaugural Poet laureate of El Cerrito, California from 2016 to 2018. Her works include the full-length poetry collection Percussing the Thinking Jar (Omnidawn, 2024) which was shortlisted for the Northern California Book Award. Her previous full-length collection Storage Unit for the Spirit House (Omnidawn, 2020) was longlisted for the PEN America 2021 Open Book Award, nominated for the Northern California Book Award in Poetry, and shortlisted for the Golden Poppy Award for Poetry. She is the 2025 Berkeley Poetry Festival Lifetime Achievement Awardee and a 2025 Recipient of the Nomadic/San Francisco Foundation Literary Award. Win's previous collections include Invisible Gifts (Manic D Press, 2018), and two chapbooks, Score and Bone (Black Lawrence Press/Nomadic Press, 2016) and Ruins of a glittering palace (SPA/Commonwealth Projects, 2013). Her work has recently been published in Alta, JMWW, The American Poetry Review, The Margins, The Bangalore Review, and other journals. She is co-publisher of Literary Cherry and editor of the Process Note Series. Along with Dawn Angelicca Barcelona and Mary Volmer, she is a co-founder of Maker, Mentor, Muse, a literary community. She teaches in the MFA Programs at the University of San Francisco and St. Mary’s College of California, and in the Low Residency MFA Program at Dominican University of California.

== Works ==
- Score and Bone Nomadic Press 2016 ISBN 978-0997093377
- Invisible Gifts: Poems Manic D Press 2018 ISBN 978-1945665080
- Storage Unit for the Spirit House 2020 ISBN 978-1632430861
- Percussing the Thinking Jar 2024 ISBN 978-1632431608

== See also ==
- List of municipal poets laureate in California
