= Mary Susan Gast =

American poet

- Born: October 27, 1945 (age 80); Benton Harbor, Michigan
- Education: Chicago Theological Seminary
- Occupations: Poet laureate of Benicia, California
- Spouse: Roger Dean Straw
- Website: marysusangast.com

Mary Susan Gast (born 1945 in Benton Harbor, Michigan) is the eighth Poet laureate of Benicia, California. She is a graduate of Michigan State University and Chicago Theological Seminary. She edits a poetry column for the Benicia Herald entitled "Going the Distance."

== Works ==
=== Books ===
- That We May All (Finally!) be One : Covenant, Hospitality, and the Expanding Identity of the United Church of Christ The Pilgrim Press. 2016. ISBN 9780829820317

=== Anthologies (Editor) ===
- Yearning to Breathe Free: A Community Journal of 2020 Benicia Literary Arts. 2020. ISBN 9781735499925

=== Anthologies (Contributor) ===
- Light and Shadow Benicia Literary Arts. 2018. ISBN 9780970373762
- Sign of the Times Benicia Literary Arts. 2012. ISBN 9781885852564

== See also ==
- List of municipal poets laureate in California
