= Jeremy Snyder =

American poet

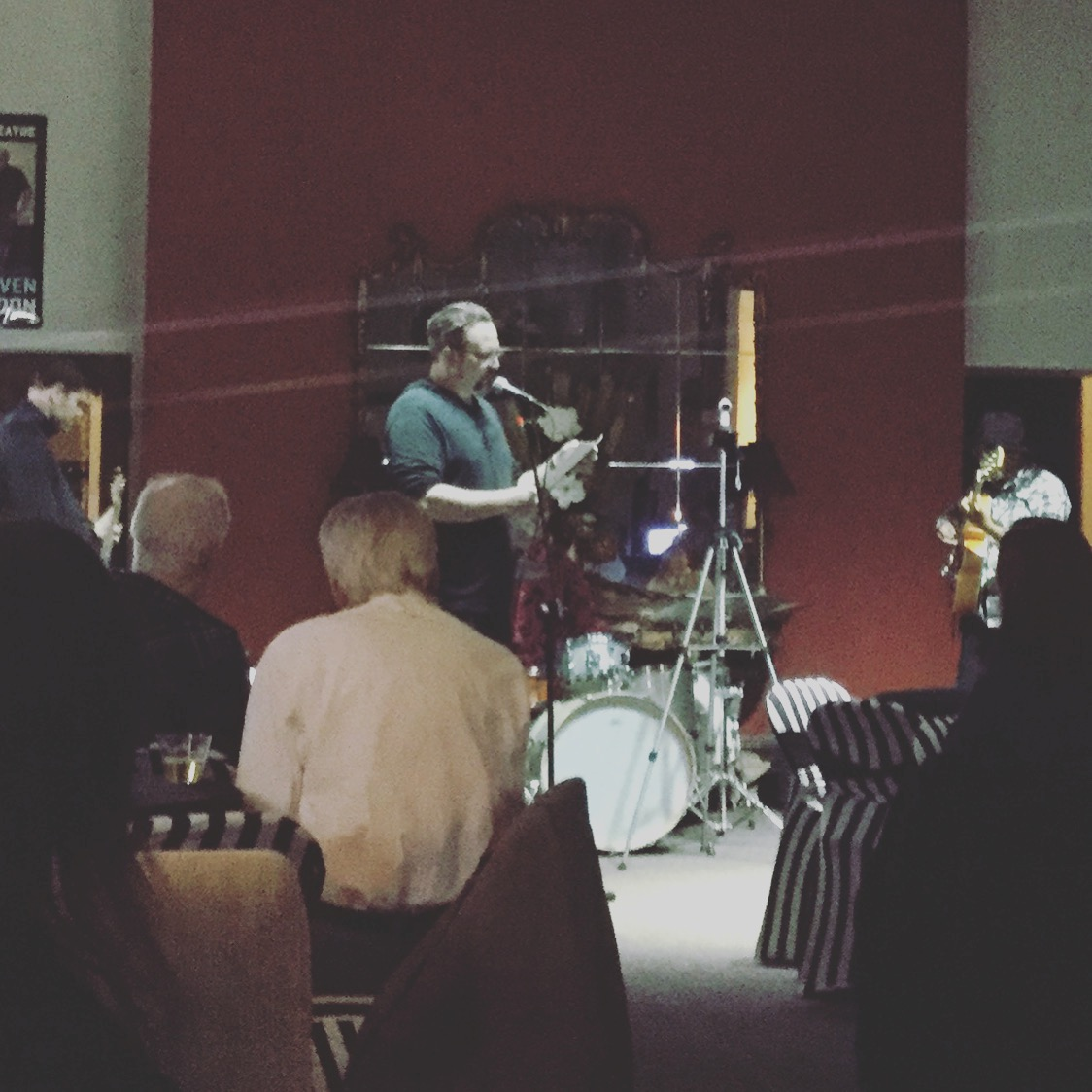
- Born: Vallejo, California
- Education: University of Montana
- Occupation: Poet laureate of Vallejo, California (2019-2023)
- Spouse: Erika Snyder
- Writing career
- Genre: poetry

Jeremy Snyder is an American poet. He served as poet laureate of Vallejo, California, from 2020 through 2023.

== Background ==
Snyder was born in Vallejo, California, educated at the University of Montana, and served in the United States Navy.

== Poetry ==
Jeremy Snyder began writing poetry at age 5. From 2018 through 2022, Snyder hosted a poetry open mic, Poetry by the Bay, at the downtown Oddfellows Hall and online. Poetry by the Bay was founded in 2008 by Kyrah Ayers. In 2023 Keith Thompson took over as show host, and the group now meets at the Mira Theatre. Snyder was appointed Vallejo’s poet laureate in January 2020 and served until December 31, 2023. In 2021 Snyder appeared on the Rooted in Poetry podcast, performed at a virtual benefit for the Solano County Library Foundation, performed with his predecessors at Alibi Bookshop, and with fellow San Francisco bay area poets laureate in Richmond, California. He hosted National Poetry Month celebrations at the Solano County Library in 2022 and Alibi Bookshop in 2023. Two women, Kathleen Herrmann and Jacalyn Eyvonne, were chosen as his successors, and he was preceded in office by D.L. Lang and Dr. Genea Brice.

In 2025 the poets laureate of Vallejo celebrated the 10th anniversary of the poet laureate program. All five Vallejo poets laureate received recognition from the California State Legislature, Solano County Supervisors, Vallejo Mayor and City Council for their service upon the program's anniversary. A sampling of their work was also included in the anthology A Decade of Poetic Unity edited by D. L. Lang.

== Publications ==
- Snyder, Jeremy, "Dirt," Gnashing Teeth Publishing, April 10, 2021
- Lang, D.L. ed., Verses, Voices, & Visions of Vallejo 2019. ISBN 9781724462633
- A Decade of Poetic Unity: Celebrating Vallejo's Poets Laureate 2025. ISBN 9798328345736

== See also ==
- Genea Brice
- D.L. Lang
- List of municipal poets laureate in California
