= Laure-Anne Bosselaar =

American poet

Laure-Anne Bosselaar is a Belgian-American poet, translator, professor, and former poet laureate of Santa Barbara, California. She is the author of four collections of poetry, most recently, These Many Rooms (Four Way Books, 2019). Her collection, Small Gods of Grief (BOA Editions), won the 2001 Isabella Gardner Prize for Poetry. A New Hunger, (Ausable Press 2008) was an American Library Association Notable Book in 2008. She is the author of Artémis, a collection of French poems, published in Belgium. Her chapbook Rooms Remembered appeared from Sungold Editions in 2018.

Her poems have been published in literary magazines and journals including Ploughshares, The Washington Post, AGNI, Harvard Review, and have been widely anthologized. Her honors include a Pushcart Prize, a Bread Loaf Writers Conference fellowship, and she was a Writer in Residence at Hamilton College in NY State, and at the Vermont Studio Center.

Bosselaar has edited many anthologies, including Never Before: Poems about First Experiences (Four Way Books, 2005), Outsiders, Poems About Rebels Exiles and Renegades, and Night Out: Poems about Hotels, Motels, Restaurants and Bars, co-edited with her husband, poet Kurt Brown. Her translations include The Plural of Happiness, Selected Poems by Herman de Coninck, co-translated with Kurt Brown (Oberlin College Press, 2006).

She grew up in Belgium, and moved to the United States in 1987. She earned her M.F.A. from the Warren Wilson College MFA Program for Writers. She taught poetry workshops in Colorado and co-directed the Aspen Writers' Conference from 1989 to 1992. She is fluent in four languages, and has published poems in French and Flemish. She was a Breadloaf Fellow, was awarded the McEver Chair at Georgia Tech, taught at Emerson College, Sarah Lawrence College, at the College of Creative Studies at University of California, Santa Barbara, and is part of the founding faculty at the Solstice Low Residency MFA in Creative Writing Program of Pine Manor College. She is the widow of poet Kurt Brown and currently lives in Santa Barbara, California.

== Published works ==
- Lately (Sungold Editions, 2023)
- These Many Rooms (Four Way Books, 2019)
- A New Hunger (Ausable Press, 2007)
- Small Gods of Grief (BOA Editions, 2001)
- The Hour Between Dog and Wolf (BOA Editions, 1997)

== Sources ==
- Author Website
