= Albert Flynn DeSilver =

American writer

- Selfie of Albert Flynn DeSilver with his book, Writing as a Path to Awakening
- Born: October 2, 1968 (age 58); Norwalk, Connecticut
- Occupations: Poet, Author
- Spouse: Marian Cremin
- Writing career
- Notable awards: 2008 Poet Laureate of Marin County, California
- Website: www.albertflynndesilver.com

Albert Flynn DeSilver (born October 2, 1968) is an American poet, writer, memoirist, novelist, speaker, publisher, and workshop leader. He is the founder of DeSilver Publishing, a hybrid publisher based in the San Francisco Bay Area that publishes memoir, fiction, spirituality, family legacy, and other books.

His latest book is SOME VOID: New & Selected Poems 1996-2026. DeSilver has been writing and publishing books for 30 years, starting with his The Owl Press imprint in the 1990s. DeSilver served as Marin County California's very first Poet Laureate from 2008 to 2010.

His work has appeared in more than one hundred literary journals worldwide including The New York Times, ZYZZYVA, New American Writing, Chicago Review, Catamaran, Hanging Loose, Jubilat, Exquisite Corpse, Jacket (Australia), Poetry Kanto (Japan), Van Gogh’s Ear (France), and many others.

DeSilver is also the author of Writing as a Path to Awakening (based on his workshops of the same name) published by Sounds True/Macmillan in 2017, as well as the memoir Beamish Boy, (2012) which Kirkus Reviews called "a beautifully written memoir, poignant and inspirational". DeSilver received a BFA in photography from the University of Colorado and an MFA in New Genres from the San Francisco Art Institute. DeSilver is a speaker and trainer who has presented at TEDx-Santa Cruz, shared the stage with Maxine Hong Kingston, Cheryl Strayed, Elizabeth Gilbert, and others. He has taught writing workshops at Esalen Institute, Omega Institute, and Spirit Rock Meditation Center, as well as at literary conferences nationally. He lives in Northern California.

== Bibliography ==
- Evidence of the Paranormal (2003, editor) With poems by Anne Waldman, Eileen Myles, John Ashbery, Bill Berkson, Joanne Kyger, and others.
- Letters to Early Street (2007, ISBN 978-1-888809-50-3)
- Walking Tooth & Cloud (2008, ISBN 978-2-914853-08-8)
- Beamish Boy, A Memoir (2013, ISBN 978-0-9669430-9-2)
- Writing as a Path to Awakening: A Year to Becoming an Excellent Writer & Living an Awakened Life (Sounds True/Macmillan, 2017, ISBN 978-1-6220391-1-1)
- Singletrack Mind: Finding Wisdom & the Poetry of Life on Two Wheels (2023) with photographs by Mattias Fredriksson (ISBN 978-0-6468673-3-5)
- SOME VOID: New & Selected Poems 1996-2026 (2026, ISBN 978-1-1057534-1-1)

== Anthologies ==
- Cloud View Poets, An Anthology with an introduction by David St. John (Arctos Press, 2009)
- Letters to Poets: Conversations about Poetics, Politics, and Community (Saturnalia Books, 2008)
- Sometimes in the Open: Poems from California’s Poets Laureate (Sacramento Poetry Center Press, 2009)
  Featuring poems by Lawrence Ferlinghetti, U.S. Poet Laureate Kay Ryan, Al Young, and Albert Flynn DeSilver among others.
- Bay Poetics: An Anthology of San Francisco Bay Area Poets Edited by Stephanie Young (Faux Press, Cambridge, MA 2006)
