= D. L. Lang =

American poet (born 1983)

Diana Lucille Lang
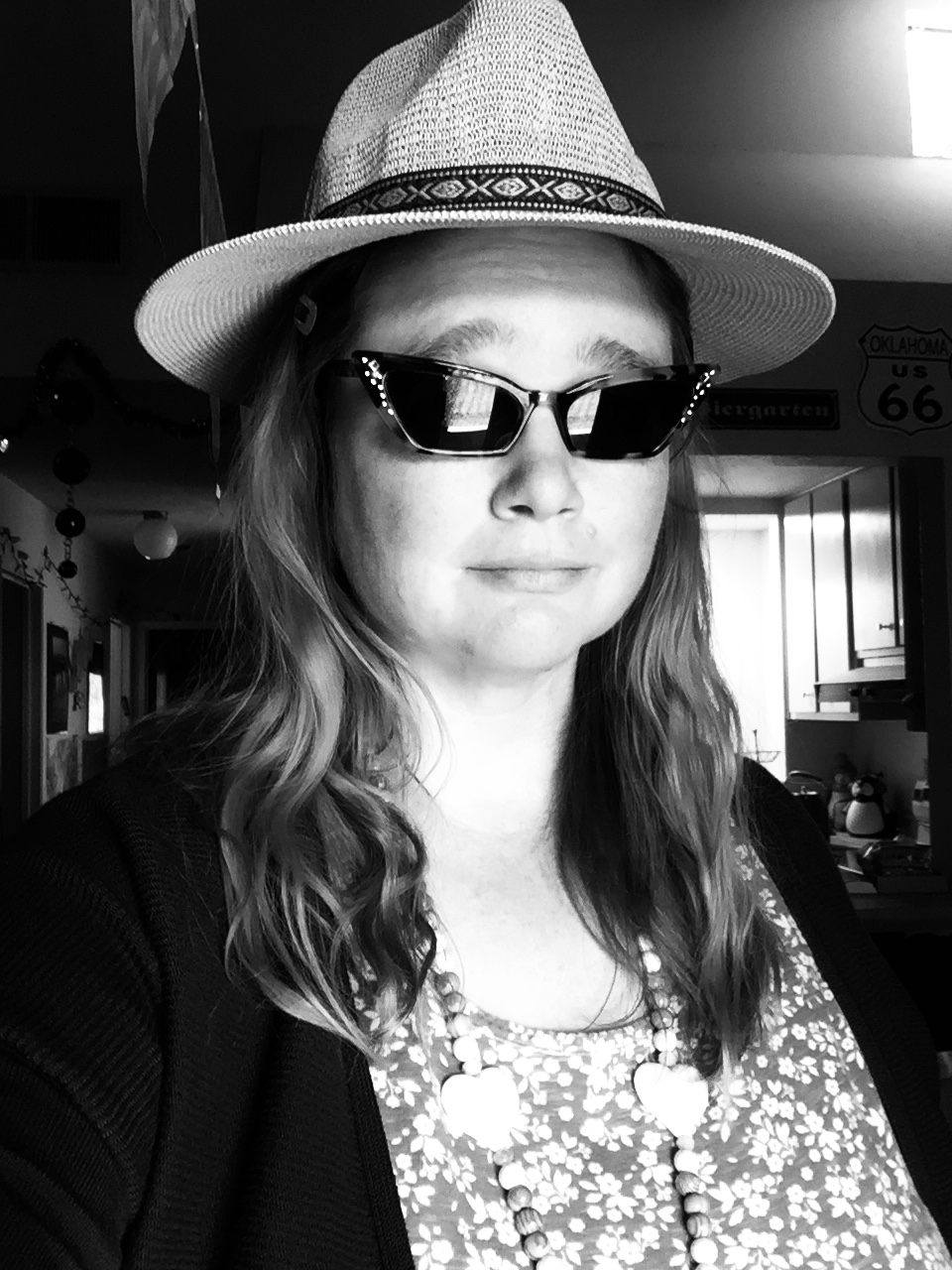
- Vallejo Poet Laureate D. L. Lang
- Born: Bad Hersfeld, West Germany
- Education: University of Oklahoma
- Occupation: Poet
- Title: Poet laureate of Vallejo, California
- Term: 2017-2019
- Predecessor: Genea Brice
- Successor: Jeremy Snyder
- Writing career
- Pen name: D. L. Lang
- Genre: poetry
- Website: dianalangpoetry.com

Diana Lucille Lang (born 1983, Bad Hersfeld, West Germany), known professionally as D. L. Lang, is an American poet. Her poetry is anthologized in over 100 anthologies. She has published 18 full-length books of poetry, and served as the Poet Laureate of Vallejo, California.

== Early life ==
Diana Lucille Lang (née Kettle) was born in Bad Hersfeld, West Germany where her American father was stationed in the military, and met her mother who is German. As a result of growing up in a military family as a child Lang relocated frequently, residing in Herleshausen, West Germany, Santa Fe, Texas, Alexandria, Louisiana, and Enid, Oklahoma. Lang graduated from Enid High School in 2001, earned an Associate of Science in General Studies at Northern Oklahoma College and a Bachelor of Arts in Film Studies with a minor in Judaic Studies from the University of Oklahoma. After college she moved to California in 2005 and married Timothy Lang in 2006, living in San Rafael, California prior to moving to Vallejo.

== Film and television ==
While in college Lang worked as a video editor at television station KXOK-LD, as webmaster for University of Oklahoma student radio station the Wire, and as a band promoter for Greg "Grey" Perkins from Enid, Oklahoma. In 2025 Perkins released the album Headline Antidote which features three songs adapted from D.L. Lang's poetry, "Headline Antidote", "Musty Books", and "Life of Dreams". Perkins also adapted Lang's poetry for the song "Oh, My Chameleon Perceptions" in 2016. Lang designed the album covers for Perkins' previous albums, Rock & Pop, Words & Music, Inquire Within, Anamnesis, Ice World, Colours, Faded Colours, Elixir: The Better and the Worse, Acoustic Grey, and Live at PEGASYS, as well as We're Almost Gone by Bermuda County. In the 2000s Lang created music videos for his songs "This is the Time, This is the Place" and "All the Love in the World", which were awarded Best Music Video at the Bare Bones Film Festival.

Lang produced television series for Enid's public access station PEGASYS, and was awarded Best Editor in 2002, and Producer of the Year in 2003 and 2004. Lang created documentary films, including Liquid Wind, a kiteboarding film by director Charles Maupin that features an interview with Mike Morgan, which was broadcast on Oklahoma PBS affiliate OETA, and The Hebrew Project, a Hebrew language film that featured University of Oklahoma professors Ori Kritz and Norman Stillman, which was broadcast on The Jewish Channel.

== Poetry ==
Lang began writing poetry as a child, first attempting to write song lyrics. She cites The Beatles, Pete Seeger, Allen Ginsberg, Jim Morrison, Woody Guthrie, and Bob Dylan as influences. In addition to writing about her life, Lang writes on themes of Judaism, music, social justice, political protest, feminism, anti-capitalism, anti-racism and pacifism. Lang began performing her poetry in 2015 at Poetry by the Bay. Her poems have been published in newspapers, journals, and anthologies.

=== Vallejo Poet Laureate ===
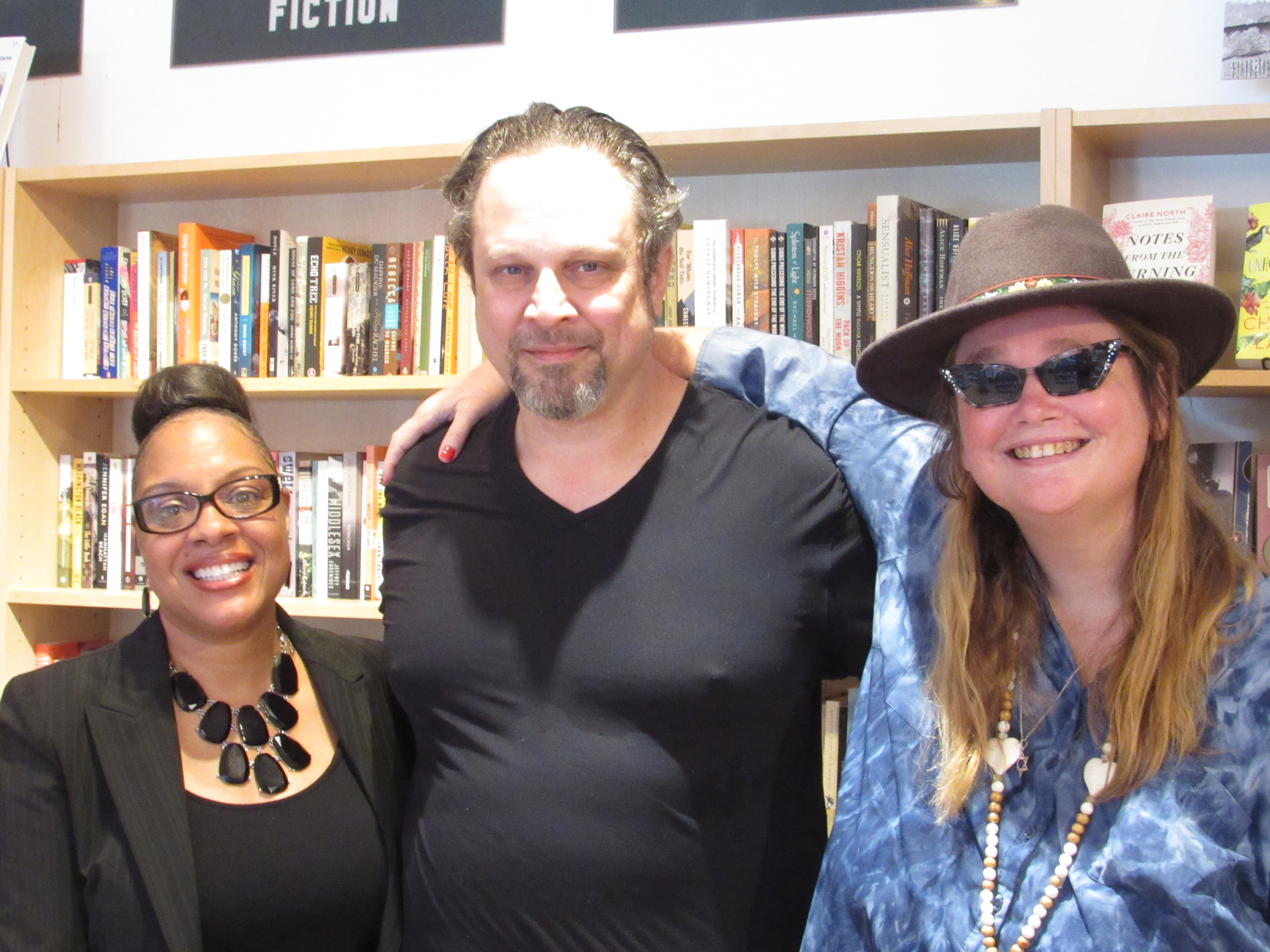
3 Vallejo Poets Laureate

D. L. Lang was appointed Poet Laureate of Vallejo, California in September 2017 and served through December 2019. As poet laureate Lang edited the poetry anthology Verses, Voices & Visions of Vallejo and performed 141 times in 18 different cities. Lang gave the invocation at the 2019 Vallejo Women's March. During her tenure she also performed her poetry at many local events, including Vallejo Unites Against Hatred, Unity Day, International Peace Day and Why Poetry Matters. Lang also gave a presentation on Emma Lazarus and Alicia Ostriker for AAUW Voices of Change. Lang also judged seven contests including the county Poetry Out Loud high school recitation competition, Joel Fallon poetry scholarship, Solano County Fair talent competition, Vallejo poetry slam, and county library teen writing competition. She performed regularly on air on KZCT and on stage at Poetry by the Bay. Like her predecessor, she led the Poetry in Notion poetry circle and hosted annual events for National Poetry Month. She attended poets laureate conferences in Tujunga and San Mateo. Lang was preceded as Vallejo's poet laureate by Dr. Genea Brice, and succeeded by Jeremy Snyder, then host of Poetry by the Bay. The California State Senate, California Arts Council, and Vallejo City Council awarded Lang with proclamations for serving as poet laureate.

In 2025 the poets laureate of Vallejo celebrated the 10th anniversary of the poet laureate program. All five Vallejo poets laureate received recognition from the California State Legislature, Solano County Supervisors, Vallejo Mayor and City Council for their service upon the program's anniversary. A sampling of their work was also included in the anthology A Decade of Poetic Unity edited by D. L. Lang.

=== 2020-present ===
In 2020 she was a featured act at the Solano County Virtual Fair, and judged the library's teen poetry competition. In 2021 she performed virtually for Poetry Flash and Point Arena Third Thursday Poetry. She also performed with Brice and Snyder at Alibi Bookshop, and for the Jewish Democrats of Solano County. In 2022 she performed for the AAUW, Solano County Library, San Francisco Public Library, a beat poetry festival at the Empress Theatre, the abortion rights group RiseUp4AbortionRights, the Beat Museum and LaborFest with the Revolutionary Poets Brigade, judged the Solano library's teen poetry competition, and appeared on the Rooted in Poetry podcast. In 2023 she performed at the Flyway Festival, Cordelia Library for Poetry Month, Vallejo Poetry Festival, Laborfest at the Tenderloin Museum, Revolution Books in Berkeley to support freeing Iranian political prisoners, and a labor protest against Elon Musk. In 2023 she was also one of ten winners of the Curbside Haiku contest in Tulsa, Oklahoma, and performed at the 2023 Woody Guthrie Folk Festival in Okemah, Oklahoma. Lang was a member of the committee to choose Snyder's successors as poet laureate, and judged the Solano Library's teen poetry competition.

In 2024 Lang performed at the Starry Plough Pub in Berkeley in support of Toomaj Salehi. She also gave a reading at a Jewish art exhibit at the Vallejo Naval and Historical Museum, with fellow poets laureate at the Fairfield Library, the Solano County Fair, Mare Island Art Studios, and the Beat Museum. She also interviewed on KZCT. In March 2024 Lang was among several Vallejo women activists who received a proclamation from the Vallejo City Council in honor of Women's History Month. She also performed at Ink and Inspiration in Enid, Oklahoma, the Scissortail Creative Writing Festival in Ada, Oklahoma, and the 2024 Woody Guthrie Folk Festival. She continues to perform poetry live on air at KZCT radio. Radio stations KPOO, KPFA, and KALW have also broadcast Lang's poetry.

Lang edited the 2025 Grateful Dead fan poetry anthology Poetry is Dead II: Once You're Dead, You're Dead Forever, and hosted a contributor reading at Alibi Bookshop. Lang also performed at Alibi Bookshop as part of the Vagabond Poetry Caravan with National Beat Poet Laureate Mark Lipman and Nina Serrano. She performed at the 2025 Woody Guthrie Folk Festival in Okemah, Oklahoma, and at Kind Origin in Ada, Oklahoma. She performed with other fan contributors at the US book launch for Billy Bragg: A People's History. In 2026 she read her contribution on episode 4 of Billy Bragg: A People's Podcast. In 2026 she performed with the Woody Guthrie Poets at the Woody Guthrie Center in Tulsa, Oklahoma, and featured at the Tidewater Winery in Drumright, Oklahoma.

Lang's poem "American Dream", originally included in the 2022 anthology Reimagine America: An Anthology for the Future, was reprinted in The Vagabond Lunar Collection which features the social justice themed work of 127 poets. Samuel Peralta's Lunar Codex time capsule project launches art stored on memory cards and nano-fiche to the moon. The Vagabond Lunar Collection anthology is included in Codex Minerva which traveled on board Intuitive Machine's Nova-C lander, Athena, and landed on the moon near Mons Mouton on March 6, 2025. It is also included in the Codex Polaris, traveling to the Nobile Crater as part of NASA's Artemis program, and is expected to launch to the moon in October 2026.

== Works ==
=== Poetry collections ===
- Tea and Sprockets 2011. ISBN 9781467900379
- Abundant Sparks and Personal Archeology 2013. ISBN 9781511726665
- Look, Ma! No Hands! 2015. ISBN 9781511726504
- Poet Loiterer 2016. ISBN 9781518713248
- Id Biscuits 2016. ISBN 9781530453054
- Barefoot in the Sanctuary 2016. ISBN 9781536820263
- Armor Against the Dawn 2016. ISBN 9781540704993
- Dragonfly Tomorrows and Dog-eared Yesterdays 2017. ISBN 9781548437725
- Resting on my Laurels 2018. ISBN 9781983939778
- The Cafe of Dreams 2018. ISBN 9781727159806
- Midnight Strike 2019. ISBN 9781072096016
- This Festival of Dreams 2020. ISBN 9798642242759
- Earthen Rovings: Poems on Mother Nature and the Environment 2020. ISBN 9798647153074
- Heaven is Portable 2022. ISBN 9798516440311
- Paradise Collectors: A Book of Jewish Poetry 2023. ISBN 9798872502203
- Wanderings 2.0: The Journey and the Destinations 2024. ISBN 9798877591356
- Fighting the Solar System 2024. ISBN 9798334584426
- Cavorting Havoc 2025. ISBN 9798282021707

=== Spoken word albums ===
- Happy Accidents 2015.

=== Poetry anthologies ===
==== Editor ====
- Verses, Voices & Visions of Vallejo 2019. ISBN 9781724462633
- Poetry is Dead II: Once You're Dead, You're Dead Forever Hercules Publishing ISBN 9798218547783
- A Decade of Poetic Unity: Celebrating Vallejo's Poets Laureate ISBN 9798328345736

==== Contributor ====
- A Poet's Siddur: Friday Evening Liturgy Through the Eyes of Poets Ain't Got No Press. 2017. ISBN 9780982058480
- Light & Shadow Benicia Literary Arts. 2018. ISBN 9780970373762
- Marin Poetry Center Anthology, Vol. 21 Marin Poetry Center. 2018. ISBN 9780988969421
- Verses, Voices & Visions of Vallejo 2019. ISBN 9781724462633
- Colossus: Home: An Anthology of Lives in and out of Place Colossus Press. 2020. ISBN 9781735252643
- Introspective BloodRedStar Publications. 2020. ISBN 9798687549165
- The Alien Buddha Wears a Black Bandanna Alien Buddha Press. 2020. ISBN 9798693006782
- Black Lives Matter: Poems for a New World Civic Leicester. 2020. ISBN 9781916459359
- Happy Fukkadays 2 U from the Alien Buddha Alien Buddha Press. 2020. ISBN 9798696227269
- Poems of Political Protest City Limits Publishing. 2020. ISBN 9781954403000
- Musings During a Time of Pandemic: A World Anthology of Poems on COVID-19 Kistrech Theatre International. 2020. ISBN 9789966955951
- Poetry: The Best of 2020 Inner Child Press. 2020. ISBN 9781952081378
- From the Soil: A Hometown Anthology Exeter Publishing. 2020. ISBN 9798583850617
- Birth Lifespan Vol. 1 Pure Slush Books. 2021. ISBN 9781922427205
- Red Skies: A Creators Response to 2020 Splintered Disorder Press. 2021. ISBN 9798702942049
- 2020: Our Voices Barnes & Noble Press. 2021. ISBN 9781666236354
- Insurrection Gnashing Teeth Publishing. 2021. ISBN 9781734049558
- The Alien Buddha Skips the Party Alien Buddha Press. 2021. ISBN 9798577062279
- Globalisation: A Poetry Collection Making Magic Happen Press. 2021. ISBN 9780645096613
- Pandemic Evolution: Days 1-100 Sheila-Na-Gig Editions. 2021. ISBN 9781735400235
- The Alien Buddha Gets A Real Job Alien Buddha Press. 2021. ISBN 9798702028163
- The Last Time the Alien Buddha Got Sooo High Alien Buddha Press. 2021. ISBN 9798726871189
- Poems from the Heron Clan Vol. VIII Katherine James Books. 2021. ISBN 9781733929936
- Adfectus Exeter Publishing. 2021. ISBN 9798515034177
- Good Cop/Bad Cop Flowersong Press. 2021. ISBN 9781953447784
- Anthology House, Vol. 2 ASEI Arts. 2021. ISBN 9780998842189
- The Rastaman: Conversations with Bob Marley Alien Buddha Press. 2021. ISBN 9798727953129
- When This is All Over ... Creative Ink Publishing. 2021. ISBN 9798518906778
- The Alien Buddha Goes Pop Alien Buddha Press. 2021. ISBN 9798511774343
- Together Behind Four Walls Goldcrest Books. 2021. ISBN 9781913719340
- Protest 2021 Moonstone Arts Center. 2021. ISBN 9781954499423
- I Can't Breathe: A Poetic Anthology of Social Justice Kistrech Theatre International. 2021. ISBN 9789914988505
- IFLAC Peace Anthology: Human Trafficking and Modern Slavery International Forum for the Literature and Culture of Peace. 2021. ISBN 9798775435080
- Cooch Behar Anthology 2022. ISBN 9798411541991
- Reimagine America: An anthology for the future Vagabond Books. 2022. ISBN 9781936293445
- International Women's Day 2022 Moonstone Arts Center. 2022. ISBN 9781954499683
- Resist with every Inch and Breath Lonely Cryptid Media. 2022. ISBN 9781005648480
- Psalms of the Alien Buddha, Vol. 2 Alien Buddha Press. 2022. ISBN 9798822053663
- May Day 2022 Moonstone Arts Center. 2022. ISBN 9781954499836
- Poetry is Dead: An Inclusive Anthology of Deadhead Poetry Hercules Publishing. 2022. ISBN 9798218003593
- Yearning to Breathe Free: A Community Journal of 2020 Benicia Literary Arts. 2022. ISBN 9781735499925
- Storm Warning: Poets for the Planet Building Socialism Revolutionary Poets Brigade. 2022. ISBN 9780938392163
- The Protest Diaries B Cubed Press. 2022. ISBN 9781949476262
- Hiroshima Day Moonstone Arts Center. 2022. ISBN 9781959038092
- When There are Nine Moon Tide Press. 2022. ISBN 9781957799032
- Colossus: Freedom Colossus Press. 2022. ISBN 9781735252650
- Remembering Jack Kerouac on his 100th Birthday New Generation Beat Publications. 2022. ISBN 9781957654010
- Banned Books Week Moonstone Arts Center. 2022. ISBN 9781959038115
- The Alien Buddha's Microdoses Alien Buddha Press. 2022. ISBN 9798844476075
- Nooks & Crannies Benicia Literary Arts. 2022. ISBN 9781735499918
- 26th Annual Poetry Ink Anthology Moonstone Press. 2023.
- American Graveyard: Calls to End Gun Violence Read or Green Books. 2023. ISBN 9798986140674
- The Alien Buddha Gets Rejected, Vol. 2 Alien Buddha Press. 2023. ISBN 9798370718717
- The Alien Buddha Gets a Real Job, Vol. 2 Alien Buddha Press. 2023. ISBN 9798378854370
- The Working Man's Hand: Celebrating Woody Guthrie Poems of Protest and Resistance Fine Dog Press. 2023. ISBN 9781955478168
- Remembering Woody Guthrie Moonstone Press. 2023. ISBN 9781959038603
- Healing a Fractured World Kallatumba Press. 2023. ISBN 9780938392170
- I Never Could Talk to You L.A. Poetry Beach Festival. 2023. ISBN 9798861584968
- Which Side Are You On? Labor Day 2023 Moonstone Press. 2023. ISBN 9781959038641
- Remembering Pablo Neruda Moonstone Press. 2023. ISBN 9781959038801
- The Sparring Artists Mystic Boxing Commission/Peer Amid Press. 2023. ISBN 9781733548168
- Am Yisrael Chai UJA-Federation of New York. 2023. ISBN 9798864248027
- The Alien Buddha Loves You Alien Buddha Press. 2023. ISBN 9798853991262
- Bill of Rights Day 2023 Moonstone Press. 2023. ISBN 9781959038887
- About Time Red Penguin Books. 2024. ISBN 9781637775363
- To Write of Love During War UJA-Federation of New York. 2024. ISBN 9798879324358
- Starman Oddity: Poetry & Art Inspired by David Bowie Fevers of the Mind. 2024. ISBN 9798880401932
- World Healing, World Peace 2024 Inner Child Press. 2024. ISBN 9781961498235
- Traitor / Patriot: A Reflection of January 6 Moonstone Press. 2024. ISBN 9781959038993
- Avalanches in Poetry Vol III: Poetry, Writings & Art Inspired by Leonard Cohen Fevers of the Mind. ISBN 9798321730034
- Boundless 2024: the Anthology of the Rio Grande Valley International Poetry Festival Flowersong Press. 2024. ISBN 9781963245585
- The Vagabond Lunar Collection: an Anthology That's Out of This World Vagabond Books. 2024.
- Unite the States of America Like a Blot from the Blue. 2024. ISBN 9798324838430
- Screaming at America! An anthology of Dissent 2024. ISBN 9781304408112
- A poetic field filled with Wildwood Flowers: an Anthology of Poetry and Prose 2024. ISBN 9798864490204
- Home: It's Complicated Museum of the American Military Family. 2024. ISBN 9798327012455
- Maintenant 18: A Journal of Contemporary Dada Writing and Art Three Rooms Press. 2024. ISBN 9781953103482
- Psalms of The Alien Buddha #3: The Final Track Alien Buddha Press. 2024. ISBN 979-8328162708
- For All Revolutionary Poets Brigade. 2024. ISBN 9780938392187
- Fatal Force: Poetic Justice Moonstone Press. 2024. ISBN 9781959038979
- Peacocks & Poems 2024. ISBN 9798329454628
- Unsettled Benicia Literary Arts. 2024. ISBN 9781735499963
- Wheelsong Poetry Anthology, Vol 5. Wheelsong Books. 2024. ISBN 9798340651204
- Whispers Across Languages Barcelona Literary. 2024. ISBN 9798344221656
- Ain't No Deadbeats Around Here Like a Blot from the Blue. 2024. ISBN 9781300879169
- Human Rights Day Moonstone Press. 2024. ISBN 9781963912289
- Lost at 27: Musicians, Artists, Mortals Cicada Song Press. 2024. ISBN 9781966275015
- Whispers of Winter, Vol V. 2024. ISBN 9798303203143
- W.A.R. II ~ We Are Revolution, Too Much Blood 2025. Inner Child Press. ISBN 9781961498518
- Orange is not a Colour: Poems Against Totalitarianism Like a Blot from the Blue. 2025. ISBN 9781300302674
- Riders on the Storm Revolutionary Poets Brigade of San Francisco. 2025. ISBN 9780938392194
- Butterflies in Gaza: A World Anthology of Poems on Peace Nsemia Inc. Publishers. 2025. ISBN 9789914760323
- Remembering Joe Hill Moonstone Press. 2025. ISBN 9781970590029
- Depose Vagabond Books. 2025. ISBN 9781958307083
- Boundless 2026: the Anthology of the Rio Grande Valley International Poetry Festival Flowersong Press. 2026. ISBN 9781963245721
- These Poems Kill Fascists Like a Blot from the Blue. 2026. ISBN 9781105316999
- Freedom 250 Moonstone Press. 2026. ISBN 9781970590449
- United We Stand Revolutionary Poets Brigade. 2026. ISBN 9781733577588
- Songs to Woody Cowboy Jamboree Press. 2026. ISBN 9798907970816

=== Poetry publications ===
- Lang, D. L., "Prayer for Shomerim", Jewish Journal of Los Angeles, February 18, 2015
- Lang, D. L., "Sheltering in Places", Benicia Herald, September 23, 2016
- Lang, D. L., "Worldly Windows", Benicia Herald, November 4, 2016
- Lang, D. L., "Stay", Benicia Herald, December 3, 2016
- Lang, D. L., "Train Whistle Polka", Benicia Herald, December 15, 2017
- Lang, D. L., "Benicia Bound", Benicia Herald, January 5, 2018
- Lang, D. L., "Love Poetry Capital Blockade", Benicia Herald, February 23, 2018
- Lang, D. L., "How to Swim through a Tornado", Benicia Herald, June 15, 2018
- Lang, D. L., "The Woodpecker's Beat", Benicia Herald, September 7, 2018
- Lang, D. L., "Turning: A Poem for Yom Kippur", Reformjudaism.org, September 17, 2018
- Lang, D. L., "49 Lights", Vallejo Times Herald, pg. A9, March 19, 2019
- Lang, D. L., "No Other Planet", Poetry Expressed Vol. 5, Spring 2020
- Lang, D. L., "One Thousand Per Day", Frost Meadow Review, April 1, 2020
- Lang, D. L., "What Remains is Love", Benicia Herald, pg A9, April 24, 2020
- Lang, D. L., "July 4th, 2020", Benicia Herald, pg A3, July 26, 2020
- Lang, D. L., "Pandemic Mismanagement", Benicia Herald, pg A3, September 30, 2020
- Lang, D. L., "Commonalities", The Lake County Bloom, September 16, 2021
- Lang, D. L., "These Wild Winds", The Lake County Bloom, September 23, 2021
- Lang, D. L., "American Dream", The Free Venice Beachhead, Vol. 470, January 2022
- Lang, D. L., "Columbia River Gorgeous", KALW Bay Poets, August 24, 2022
- Lang, D. L., "Labor Shortage", Work & the Anthropocene, September 5, 2022
- Lang, D. L., "What Dreams Danced Here?" The Lake County Bloom, October 20, 2022
- Lang, D. L., "The Northwest" The Lake County Bloom, October 20, 2022
- Lang, D. L., "Fire, Water, Wind", Benicia Herald, January 8, 2023, page A5
- Lang, D. L., "Eternal", Benicia Herald, April 9, 2023
- Lang, D. L., "Who?" People's Tribune, October 18, 2023
- Lang, D. L., "Ars Poetica", Vallejo Weekly, October 19, 2023
- Lang, D. L., "October is Filled with Sorrow", Benicia Herald, October 22, 2023, page A5
- Lang, D. L., "I Pray for My People", Benicia Herald, November 5, 2023, page A5
- Lang, D. L., "This Hanukkah", Benicia Herald, December 8, 2023, page B5
- Lang, D. L., "Lightfoot Lives On", eMerge Magazine, January 8, 2024
- Lang, D. L., "MLK", Benicia Herald, January 14, 2024, page A6
- Lang, D. L., "In Wartime how Dare we Love?" Benicia Herald, February 25, 2024
- Lang, D. L., "Owasso", Benicia Herald, March 1, 2024
- Lang, D. L., "Falling Stars", California Quarterly, Vol. 50, No. 1, Spring 2024
- Lang, D. L., "Love Letter to Louisiana", Suisun Valley Review, #40, Spring 2024, May 17, 2024
- Lang, D. L., "Outlaw Code", Beat Poetry Outlaw series, Fevers of the Mind, May 22, 2024.
- Lang, D. L., "To Fulfill the Workers' Dream", Forward Together: CPUSA 32nd National Convention Program Book, pg 8.
- Lang, D. L., "Ignite", "The Freedom to Love", "There are Seven Blessings at the End of the Rainbow", Pride 2024, Alien Buddha Press, June 1, 2024.
- Lang, D. L., "Dylan", "Hope of All People", "Welcome ... Type HARD!!!", Hard Rain Poetry Series Inspired by Bob Dylan, Fevers of the Mind, June 4, 2024.
- Lang, D. L., "Displaced Lines", eMerge Magazine, July 8, 2024.
- Lang, D. L., "The Dreamers", "Poem for Woody Guthrie", "Revolution in Rhyme", "Living Dead", "Ode to Bob Dylan", Fevers of the Mind, July 26, 2024
- Lang, D. L., "We Must Pick Up the Pieces", People's Tribune August 21, 2024
- Lang, D. L., "A Roasted Poet Still Spits Fire", Emerge Magazine October 14, 2025
- Lang, D. L., "Lennon", Fevers of the Mind, December 13, 2024
- Lang, D. L., "How Can I Teach You to Follow a Dream?" California Poets January 8, 2025
- Lang, D. L., "The Golden Gate", Emerge Magazine March 21, 2025
- Lang, D. L., "National Librarian Axed" Benicia Library May 23, 2025
- Lang, D. L., "Brian, what would We all be without You?" Fevers of the Mind June 11, 2025
- Lang, D. L., "Apparitions of Fate", Emerge Magazine September 26, 2025
- Lang, D. L., "Were We Not Afraid", Emerge Magazine November 28, 2025
- Lang, D. L., “Heartbroken Holidays,” Benicia Herald December 19, 2025
- Lang, D. L., “She was Good,” Benicia Herald January 16, 2026
- Lang, D. L., “Injustice Isn’t Pretty,” Benicia Herald January 30, 2026
- Lang, D. L., “Protecting women beyond Women’s Month,” Benicia Herald March 29, 2026
- Lang, D. L., “A Butterfly Earns Its Wings,” Benicia Herald August 28, 2026
- Lang, D. L., "The Cycle Must Cease," People's Tribune October 10, 2026

=== Articles and essays ===
- Lang, Diana L., "Enid's Ties to Railroad History", Enid News & Eagle, October 16, 2019
- "A Collective Experience to Learn" Global Pandemic Crisis: A Series of Literary Essays on Quarantine Transcendent Zero Press. 2020. ISBN 9781946460257
- "Oklahoma Community Protests the Election of White Nationalist", People's Tribune, August 18, 2023
- "Oklahoma Voters Successfully Recall White Nationalist", People's Tribune, April 25, 2024
- "How Enid, Okla., united to remove a local fascist from office", People's World, May 7, 2024
- "Proletarian verse and protest songs thrive at Woody Guthrie Folk Fest in Oklahoma", People's World, July 22, 2024.
- Billy Bragg: A People's History Spenwood Books. 2025. ISBN 9781915858368

== See also ==
- Genea Brice
- Jeremy Snyder
- Jacalyn Eyvonne
- Kathleen Herrmann
- List of municipal poets laureate in California
