= Terry Ehret =

American poet

- Born: 1955 (age 70–71); San Francisco, California, U.S.
- Education: Stanford University; San Francisco State University (MA)
- Occupation: Poet

Terry Ehret (born 1955 in San Francisco) is an American poet. She has published several collections of poetry including Suspensions, Lost Body, and Translations from the Human Language.

== Life ==
She graduated from Stanford University in 1977, and from San Francisco State University in 1984, with an MA. She is the co-founder of Sixteen Rivers Press, a shared-work publishing collective for San Francisco Bay Area poets.

She served as poet laureate of Sonoma County, from 2004 to 2006, where she lives with her husband.

== Awards ==
- 1993 National Poetry Series
- 1994 California Book Award, silver medal for poetry
- 1995 Nimrod/Hardman Pablo Neruda Poetry Prize
- 2008 Northern California Book Reviewers nomination for poetry

== Work ==
- Lucky Break. Sixteen Rivers Press. 2008. ISBN 978-0-9767642-6-7.
- Translations from the Human Language. Sixteen Rivers Press. 2001. ISBN 978-0-9707370-1-4.
- How We Go on Living (Protean Press, 1995)
- Lost Body. Copper Canyon Press. 1993. ISBN 978-1-55659-057-3.

=== Anthologies ===
- Orpheus and Company: Contemporary Poems on Greek Mythology (University of New England Press, 1996)
- Sam Hamill, ed. (1996). The gift of tongues: twenty-five years of poetry from Copper Canyon Press. Copper Canyon Press. ISBN 978-1-55659-116-7.
- Geri Digiorno; Bill Vartnaw, eds. (2007). Petaluma Poetry Walk 10-Year Anthology: 1996 To 2005. Taurean Horn Press. ISBN 978-0-931552-15-1.
