= Genea Brice =

American poet

Dr. Genea Brice
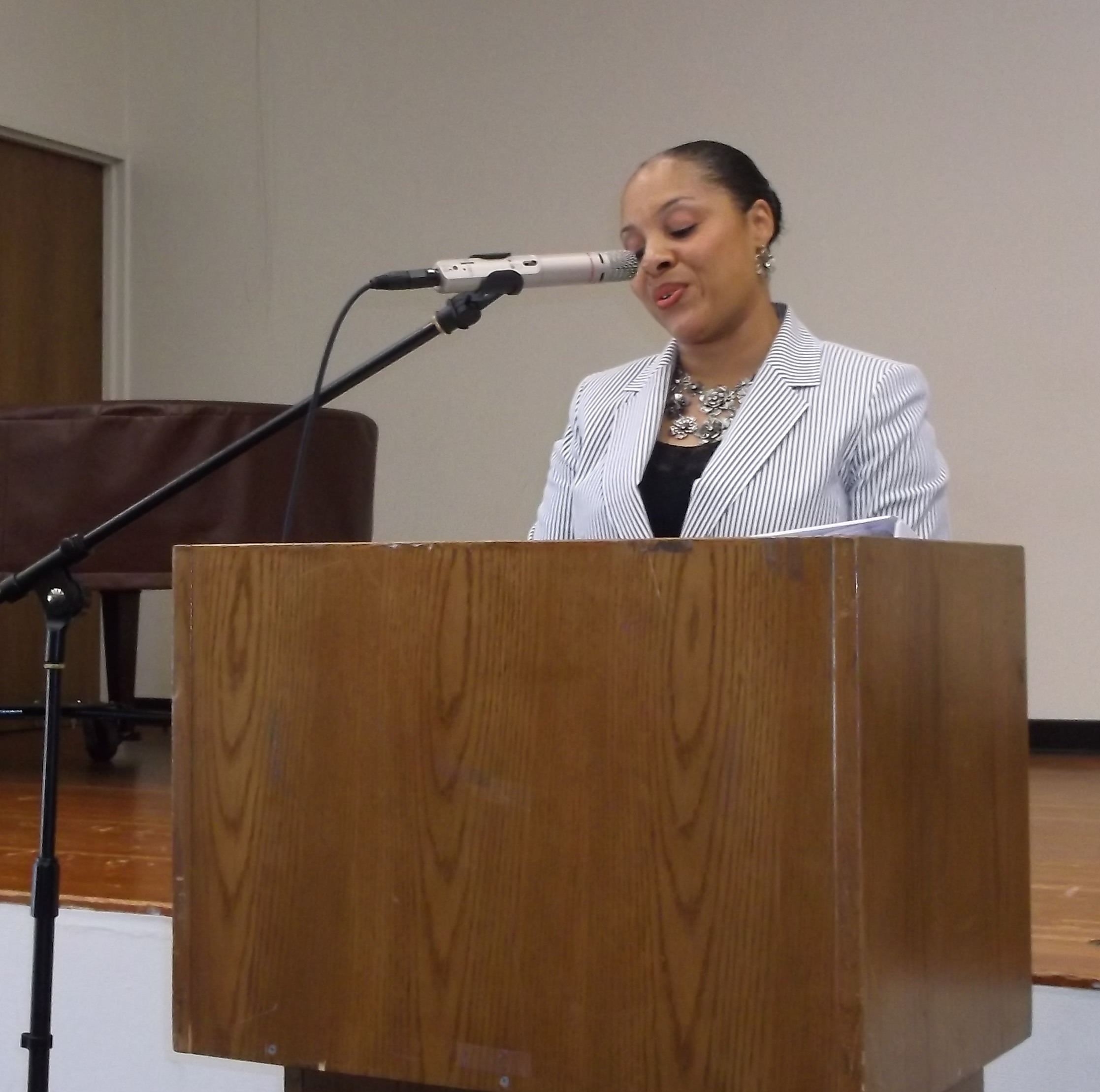
- Vallejo Poet Laureate Genea Brice
- Born: Oakland, California
- Education: Sacramento Theological Seminary and Bible College
- Occupation: Poet laureate of Vallejo, California (2015-2017)
- Writing career
- Genre: poetry
- Website: geneabrice.com

Genea Sheles Brice is an American poet. She was the first Poet Laureate of Vallejo, California.

== Biography ==
She was born in Oakland, California and raised in Vallejo, California. Brice is a graduate of Hogan Senior High School in Vallejo. She holds a Bachelor of Arts in Liberal Studies with a concentration in English Literature and a Teaching Credential from Patten University. She went on to the Sacramento Theological Seminary and Bible College to earn her Master of Arts and doctorate in Theological Studies. In addition to becoming Vallejo's first poet laureate, she served on the Commission on Culture and the Arts. Following her service as poet laureate she briefly relocated to Dallas, Texas in 2018. She currently resides in Vacaville, California and works as a teacher.

== Poetry ==
A poetry aficionado since her youth, Brice advocated for the founding of the poet laureate program in Vallejo. She served as poet laureate of Vallejo, California from August 2015 to September 2017. During her tenure, she performed at several local events and celebrations, including Art Walk, Visions of the Wild, Women's History Month, Juneteenth, Martin Luther King Jr. Day, and a vigil after the Charlottesville car attack. She taught students about Martin Luther King Jr., gave presentations on Maya Angelou and Sonia Sanchez for Voices of Change and spoke about Ernest J. Gaines at the Solano County Library. Brice lead a monthly poetry circle, Poetry in Notion, and hosted annual shows for National Poetry Month. She also spoke at events for numerous organizations including Alpha Kappa Alpha, NAACP, Community Democratic Club, Delta Sigma Theta, The Links, Rotary Club, Harvest House, United States Forest Service, Soroptimist International, and Vallejo Sister Cities. She was succeeded as poet laureate by D.L. Lang in 2017.

In 2020 Brice performed at a rally against police violence in Vallejo. In 2021 she performed at a virtual benefit for the Solano County Library Foundation. She also read at the Juneteenth flag raising at Martin Luther King, Jr. park in Vallejo, and at another commemoration of Juneteenth in Suisun City. She also performed with her successors at Alibi Bookshop. In 2022 she read in Fairfield at a Juneteenth event for the Solano County Library. In 2023 she helped high school seniors with a Black History Month poetry project, and performed at the Cordelia Library for National Poetry Month, and at Alibi Bookshop for the Vallejo Poetry Festival. In 2024 she performed at a Black History Month event in Vallejo, an event promoting literacy in Fairfield, and at the Fairfield Library with fellow poets laureate. Brice performed at a Juneteenth flag raising ceremony at the Vallejo Museum in 2025.

In 2025 the poets laureate of Vallejo celebrated the 10th anniversary of the poet laureate program. All five Vallejo poets laureate received recognition from the California State Legislature, Solano County Supervisors, Vallejo Mayor and City Council for their service upon the program's anniversary. A sampling of their work was also included in the anthology A Decade of Poetic Unity edited by D. L. Lang.

== Works ==
=== Poetry collections ===
- A Way with Words: Poems, Prose, and other Masterpieces 2017. ISBN 9781973926818

=== Anthologies ===
- A Word for All Seasons Benicia Literary Arts, 2014. ISBN 9780970373717
- Poeming Pigeons: Poems about Birds The Poetry Box. 2015. ISBN 9780986330421
- Verses, Voices, & Visions of Vallejo 2019. ISBN 9781724462633
- Yearning to Breathe Free: A Community Journal of 2020 Benicia Literary Arts. 2022. ISBN 9781735499925
- Peacocks & Poems 2024. ISBN 9798329454628
- A Decade of Poetic Unity: Celebrating Vallejo's Poets Laureate 2025. ISBN 9798328345736

=== Publications ===
- Brice, Genea, “A Tuesday Text,” Benicia Herald, October 7, 2020.
- Brice, Genea, “Galveston,” Benicia Herald, June 18, 2021.
- Brice, Genea, “Vacaville,” The Diablo Gazette, April 2022.

=== Memoir ===
- Weaned in the Desert: Souvenirs from Sacred Seasons with my Savior Xulon Press. 2010. ISBN 9781615797271

=== Spoken word album ===
- A Way with Words: The Poet Speaks (2024)

== See also ==
- D.L. Lang
- Jeremy Snyder
- List of municipal poets laureate in California
