= Rochester Poets =

Rochester Poets is the oldest ongoing literary organization in the upstate New York region. Founded in 1920 as the Rochester, New York, chapter of the Poetry Society of America, the group ceased its affiliation with the Society in the 1980s in order to accept a wider variety of members. At that time, the organization adopted its current name.

From June 2005 to May 2013, meeting/workshops were held monthly on the third (later fourth) Saturday at the Center at High Falls Gallery; the Gallery closed in June 2013, and subsequent meetings were held at various venues such as Panera Bread restaurants in the Rochester area.

From 2003 to 2005, the organization held monthly readings at Writers & Books. In January 2006, the venue was changed to St. John Fisher College in Pittsford, NY, where it held a reading on the third Sunday of each month in the Ross Art Gallery of the Skalny Welcome Center. In August, 2015, the group moved to the Clover Center for Arts & Spirituality in Brighton, NY. In March 2017, they moved to the Legacy at Clover Blossom complex, also in Brighton, and to Legacy at Cranberry Landing in Irondequoit, NY in early 2018.

A large portion of the Rochester Poetry Society and Rochester Poets correspondence, minutes and other documents from 1922 to 1973 are archived in the Rare Books and Special Collection Department of the Rush Rhees Library located at the University of Rochester.

== Activities ==
Rochester Poets sends out regular email flyers of area literary events, publishes a monthly newsletter and The Pinnacle Hill Review*, an annual anthology of selected member work. The group maintains a website, a mailing list (informing subscribers of area literary events) which can be joined via the website, and a blog.

From 2004 to 2011, Rochester Poets sponsored an annual Poets Against the War event for the Rochester area. From April 2007 until September 2009, they co-sponsored a monthly series of readings at the Anti-War Storefront of the Peace, Action & Education Committee of Rochester MetroJustice.

In 2006, they began sponsoring annual World Poetry Day and National Poetry Month celebrations at St. John Fisher College in March and April of each year; the World Poetry Day event was merged with the April National Poetry Month event in 2009. The Celebration is open to poets, musicians and singers of all ages and levels from throughout the region.

From 2007 to 2011, the group sponsored an Emerging Poets event in December of each year at St. John Fisher College. The event was open to poets of all ages; the primary criterion for eligibility was that participants were not yet "established" with a published volume of poems or had a significant number of poems appear in literary journals. From 2007 to 2011, the group also hosted the weekly Free Speech Zone series each Tuesday at the Tango Cafe in Rochester; the series moved to Mondays in 2011 before it was suspended in December 2011 pending finding a new venue.

== Publications ==
The group's anthology has had various titles over the years, among them The Oracle, Touchstone, The Gleam, In Between Seasons, Images, Daylight Burning Lanterns, Disguised As Shapes You Love, and, most recently, The Pinnacle Hill Review. Many of the volumes are held by the Rochester Public Library, Central Branch Literature Collection.

== Notable members ==
The group was founded by Edith Willis Forbes, who was also active in the Women's Education and Industrial Union, the Daughters of the American Revolution, and the Door of Hope; its first president was Carl Lamson Carmer. Past and current members of note include Al Poulin, Jr. (1938–1996), Patricia Janus (1932–2006), Dale Davis, Leah Zazulyer, Cornelius Eady, Dane Gordon, Jordan Smith, James Lavilla-Havelin, Etta Ruth Weigl, Israel Emiot (1909–1978), Gary Lehmann, John Roche, Vincent Golphin, Anne Coon, Carol Oliver, Gerald Clarke, Robert Koch, Wynne McClure, Ruth Kennedy, Francesca Gulì (ca 1921–2009), Paul Humphrey (1915–2001), Eleanor McQuilken (1908–2004), George Monagan (1925–2005), David Michael Nixon, W. E. Butts (1944–2013), Linda Allardt, Patricia Roth Schwartz, John Cieslinski, Beatrice O'Brien, Judith Kitchen (1941-2014), Stanley Rubin, and Frank Judge, the organization's president since 2003.

Other Rochester area poets of note affiliated with the group include Adelaide Crapsey (1878–1914), who knew many of the founders of the group, Anthony Hecht (1923-2004), William Heyen, and Anthony Piccione (1939–2001), who were honored by the Society, and John Ashbery (1927–2017), who was raised in the area and knew and remained friends with many of the group's members and officers.

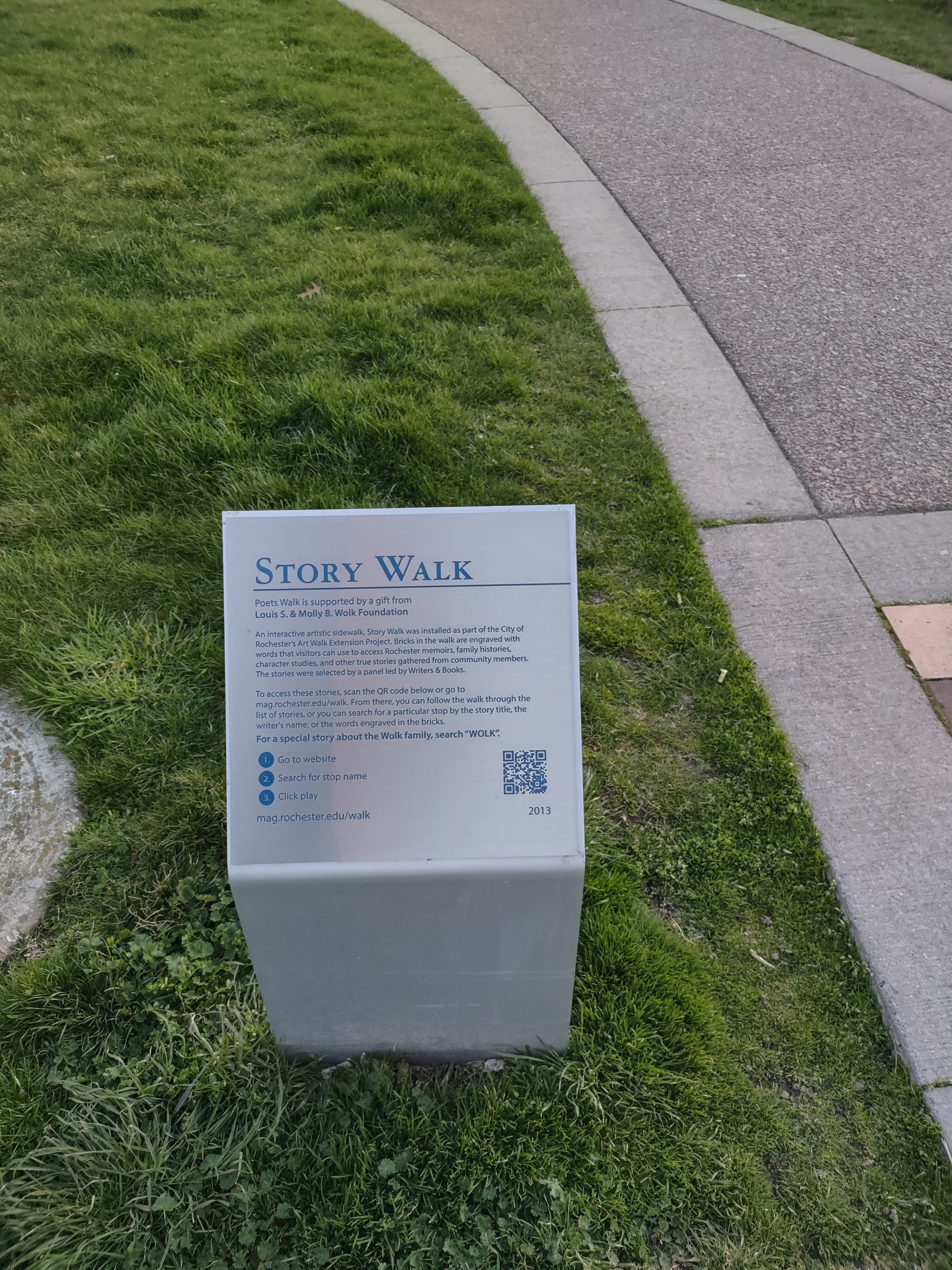
Story Walk in 2024

== Rochester Poets Walk ==
In 2009, officials of the City of Rochester, in conjunction with the Art Walk Project, which had created an area along University Avenue in Rochester in the "arts district", proposed an extension west along University and north and south along Goodman Street. The majority of the project would be along the sidewalks bordering two sides of Rochester's Memorial Art Gallery. The relationship between the City and Art Walk deteriorated, and eventually, a new entity, The Art Walk Extension Project, was created. Two of the proposed developments for the Extension were a Poets Walk, to be constructed in 2012 as a redesigned front sidewalk of MAG on University, and a Fiction Writers Walk, still in development, on the east side of the Gallery along Goodman.

Many of those nominated for inclusion in Poets Walk were poets (a number of them deceased) who were members of Rochester Poets or had been honored by or affiliated with the group in some way. And many of those nominees were among the first inductees honored in November 2011. They included: Sam Abrams, Linda Allardt, John Ashbery, Anne C. Coon, Adelaide Crapsey, Finvola Drury, Cornelius Eady, Israel Emiot, Vincent F. A. Golphin, Dane Gordon, Anthony Hecht, William Heyen, M. J. Iuppa, Patricia Janus, bobby johnson, Kathryn Jospé, Frank Judge, Galway Kinnell, Judith Kitchen, James LaVilla-Havelin, Li-Young Lee. Gary Lehmann, Stephen Lewandowski, Karla Linn Merrifield, John Logan, Donna Marbach, Rennie McQuilkin, Eleanor McQuilkin, Marianne Moore, David Michael Nixon, Lori D. Nolasco, Beatrice O'Brien, Joel Oppenheimer, Anthony Piccione, Jarold Ramsay, Hyam Plutzik, A. Poulin, Jr., Shreela Ray, Patricia Roth Schwartz, W. D. Snodgrass, Bruce Sweet, Michael Waters, and Leah Zazulyer.
