= Frank Judge =

American journalist

Frank Judge (July 17, 1946 – February 19, 2021) was an American poet, publisher, translator, journalist, film critic, teacher, and arts administrator. His work has appeared in numerous literary journals, including New Directions, The Greenfield Review, New Orleans Review, Bellingham Review, Mediterranean Review, Frogpond, Miller's Pond, HazMat Review, Bitterroot, Invisible City, Blank Tape, Manticora, Brass Bell, Talker of the Town, Troutswirl, Lake Affect, and Writer Online. His translations have appeared in Poesia verde, Rapporti, and Tam-Tam (Italy), and other journals. In 2012, he was among the first poets inducted into the Rochester Poets Walk, a walk of fame in the sidewalk along University Avenue in front of Rochester's Memorial Art Gallery.

== Career ==
Judge declined an offer to teach at Rochester Institute of Technology to accept a Fulbright Fellowship to Italy. He spent over a year in Rome. During his time in Italy and for several years after his return, he was a contributor to and an editor of The Vanderbilt Poetry Review, and he compiled and edited material for an anthology of contemporary Italian poetry published as a special issue of the Review. In his introduction to the anthology, Italian poet Pietro Cimatti notes that it "presents itself as honestly as its poems – tastefully and unpretentiously; including some notable poets, many who have been writing for years, and some relatively new ones – an open-ended package, a heterogeneous product of language by skilled craftsmen". Of Judge's work as a poet and translator, scholar and translator Glauco Cambon observed that "he moves at ease between English and Italian literature, between writing his own poetry and translating poems from other languages."

The volume contained his translations of poems by Sandro Penna, Danilo Dolci, Nelo Risi, Vittorio Sereni, Andrea Zanzotto, Pietro Cimatti, and others. He also translated the work of Afrikaans poet Breyten Breytenbach, as well as his own poetry and the work of other American poets such as John Berryman, William Heyen and Lyn Lifshin, into Italian.

As a journalist, Judge was an editor and writer on arts, entertainment, consumer affairs and consumer electronics. He wrote on film for over 40 years, starting during his stay in Rome where he wrote film reviews for the Rome Daily American, the daily English language newspaper for expatriates and tourists. After his return to Rochester, he became Entertainment Editor for the Rochester-based Valley Magazine, which covered the entire Genesee Valley Region. He also wrote reviews and entertainment-related articles for the Rochester Times-Union and the Wolfe newspaper chain, then became Managing Editor of the arts newspaper, Rochester Routes.

He interviewed numerous authors, actors, directors and other celebrities. In 1983, on the recommendation of a local radio station manager, he became the film reviewer for community station WGMC-FM in Rochester.

Judge's poetry has been anthologized in such publications as Italian Poetry Today, Poets Against the War (2003), VoicesInWartime.org, Summer Songs (2004), Knocking on the Silence (2005), an anthology of poetry inspired by the Finger Lakes region of New York State; Uncensored Songs (2007), a collection of poems honoring poet Sam Abrams; Liberty's Vigil: 99 Poets Among the 99% (2012), a volume dedicated to the Occupy Movement; The Last Ginkgo (2015), an anthology of haiku poetry; The Sexuality Poems (2017), Gesture (2018), Coast to Coast (2018), Four Hundred and Two Snails (2018), and A Moment's Longing (2019). A number of his poems have been published as broadsides, mounted art, poem-postcards and calling cards, as well as on several Dial-a-Poem services.

His books include Two Voices and Approximations. Mounted and framed copies of his poems have been included in exhibitions in the Rochester area at such venues as the Center at High Falls Gallery, the Rochester Contemporary Art Center, the Fourwalls Gallery, the Books, Etc. Gallery (Macedon, NY), the Williams Art Gallery of the First Unitarian Church of Rochester, and the Link Gallery in Rochester's City Hall.

He was editor and publisher of Exit Online and the Pinnacle Hill Review. From 2003, he was the President of Rochester Poets; in October 2004 he was one of the founding members of the Rochester Area Haiku Group; in 2005 he became Director of the Rochester Poetry Workshop, which he formed from the Rochester area Meetup poetry group when Meetup announced it would impose a monthly fee for its previously free flagship service. From 2011 to 2018 he taught creative writing at OASIS, the group of educational centers founded in 1983 and supported for many years by The May Company, which became part of Macy's.

From 2003, Judge hosted the monthly Rochester Poets reading series, which was initially held at Rochester's Writers & Books literary center but, in 2005, moved to St. John Fisher College, where it was held in the Ross Art Gallery of the Skalny Welcome Center until 2015. In the fall of 2016, the series moved to The Clover Center for Arts & Spirituality, relocated to the Brighton Legacy at Clover Blossom complex in March 2017, and then to Legacy at Cranberry Landing in 2018.

From 2004 to 2011, he was the Rochester area organizer for Poets Against the War & Occupation; from March 2007 to September 2009, he hosted a monthly reading series at Rochester's anti-war Peace Storefront, a program of the Peace Action & Education task force of Metro Justice of Rochester. The Storefront closed at the end of September 2009 due to lack of funding, and, when no new location materialized, the series was suspended. He was a member of PA&E and was involved in its PeaceWorks Rochester project.

From 2006 to 2010, Judge served as coordinator for the Western New York annual World Poetry Day Festival held at St. John Fisher College. In 2011, he became the Rochester area coordinator for 100 Thousand Poets for Change, an annual event held in late September founded by poet Michael Rothenberg.

In December 2008, he started the monthly series, Rochester Poets @ Lovin' Cup, a cafe which opened in the summer of 2008 at Park Point near RIT in Henrietta, NY. The series was discontinued in 2009 when time constraints, audience mix, lack of publicity and promotion, and changing focus by the venue made an ongoing literary event unfeasible.

From August 2007 to August 2009, Judge hosted the bi-weekly Free Speech Zone series at Rochester's Mez Cafe. The Mez closed in August 2009. In October, the venue was renovated and re-opened under new management as the Tango Cafe. The Free Speech Zone resumed in November, 2009 and ran until December, 2011.

== Notable relatives ==
Judge was a cousin of Italian-born film and television actor and Academy member Cesare Danova and Roman artist Sergio Deitinger, who painted under the name DeiTinger. He was also related to Italian novelist Alberto Moravia via another Italian cousin. His cousin Edmund Wall was a poet in the Troy-Albany, NY area.
