= Gods of Aberdeen =

2005 novel by Micah Nathan

- First edition cover
- Author: Micah Nathan
- Language: English
- Genre: Novel
- Publisher: Simon & Schuster
- Publication date: June 4, 2005
- Publication place: United States
- Media type: Print (hardback & paperback)
- Pages: 369 pp (first edition, hardback)
- ISBN: 0-7432-5082-6 (first edition, hardback)

Gods of Aberdeen is a novel written by Micah Nathan, published in June 2005 by Simon & Schuster. It was translated into Italian, Russian, Spanish, and Portuguese with the title The Last Alchemist. The novel is written in first-person, and follows the freshman year of the narrator, Eric Dunne, a 16-year-old linguistic savant who attends fictional Aberdeen College, in the town of Fairwich, Connecticut. The novel achieved best-seller status in Italy, selling over 40k copies.
