= James Lavilla-Havelin =

American poet, editor and educator

James Samuel Havelin is an American poet, editor and educator. Havelin founded the poetry series Poetry Central in Rochester in the early 1970s. He also edited the Poetry Central Newsletter, which provided information on literary events in the upstate New York region. Poetry Central also collaborated on several literary events in conjunction with other area organizations, such as the English and Continuing Education departments of the University of Rochester, the Writer's Forum at SUNY Brockport, and Rochester Poets, of which he was member.

After several years working as a manager at Scranton's, a Rochester, NY area stationery-bookstore chain in the 1970s, he briefly moved to Boston. While there, he was active in the New England Resistance, an anti-war draft resistance organization, and lived in the office in the shadow of the Boston Police Department. During this time he held numerous poetry readings. In 1969 co-founded Charon Press with friends and colleagues Dave Roberts and Chip Schramm.

He later returned to Rochester and took a position at the University of Rochester's Memorial Art Gallery directing educational programs.

He married Lucia Lavilla in 1976, and both he and his wife took the surname Lavilla-Havelin.

For several years, he hosted a weekly radio program, "Parnassus of the Air" on WXXI, the Rochester, NY PBS affiliate.

Since 1986, he has held positions at museums in New York, Cleveland, and, since 1994, in San Antonio, Texas at the Southwest School of Art as Young Artist Program Director.

His publications include Rites of Passage (Charon Books, 1969), Simon's Masterpiece (White Pine Press, 1983), Counting (Pecan Grove Press, 2010), and several chapbooks.
