= Augsburg University =

Lutheran university in Minneapolis, Minnesota, U.S.

Coordinates: 44.9659°N 93.2416°W

- Augsburg University Seal
- Former names: Augsburg Seminarium (1869–1873); The Norwegian Danish Evangelical Lutheran Augsburg Seminary (1873–1892); Augsburg Seminary (1892–1942); Augsburg College and Theological Seminary (1942–1963); Augsburg College (1963–2017)
- Motto: Education for Service
- Type: Private university
- Established: 1869; 157 years ago
- Religious affiliation: Evangelical Lutheran Church in America
- Academic affiliations: CUMU; Space-grant
- Endowment: $80.9 million (2025)
- President: Paul C. Pribbenow
- Provost: Paula O'Loughlin
- Students: 3,152
- Location: Minneapolis, Minnesota, United States
- Campus: Urban
- Colors: Maroon and gray
- Nickname: Auggies
- Sporting affiliations: NCAA Division III – MIAC
- Mascot: Eagle
- Website: www.augsburg.edu

Augsburg University is a private university in Minneapolis, Minnesota, United States. It is affiliated with the Evangelical Lutheran Church in America. It was founded in 1869 as a Norwegian-American Lutheran seminary known as Augsburg Seminarium. Today, the university enrolls approximately 2,400 undergraduate and 700 graduate students.

== History ==
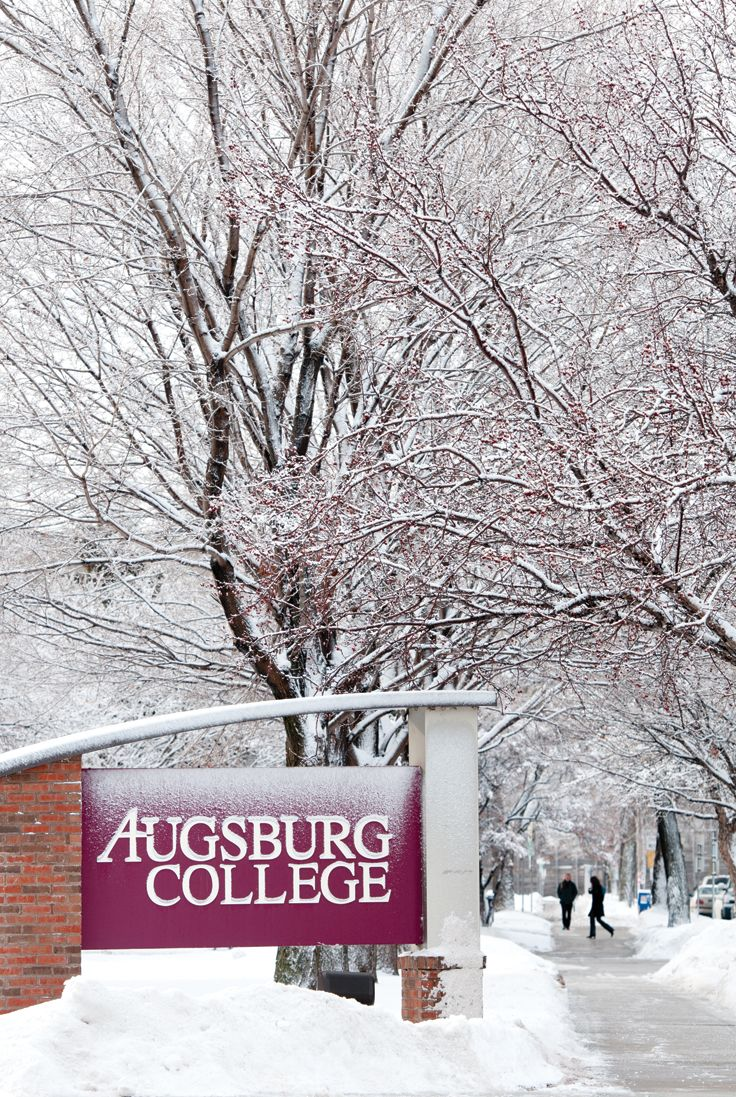

Norwegian Lutherans founded Augsburg as a seminary. It was named after the Augsburg Confession of 1530, the primary confession of faith presented by Lutherans in Augsburg, Germany, and contained in the Book of Concord of 1580. Augsburg Seminarium opened in September 1869, in Marshall, Wisconsin. Three years later, it moved to Minneapolis, changing its name to The Norwegian Danish Evangelical Lutheran Augsburg Seminary to reflect the name of the church body that sponsored the school. Undergraduate classes began in the fall of 1874, with the first class graduating in 1879. In 1892, the school's name was shortened to Augsburg Seminary. In 1893, reacting to what it deemed overly hierarchical elements in the Norwegian church, Augsburg leaders organized the "Friends of Augsburg", which by 1897 had coalesced to form a new Lutheran denomination, the Lutheran Free Church, a body that flourished for 70 years. During its early years the college and seminary served men only; women were first admitted in 1921. To further expand its mission, a high school level Augsburg Academy was provided on the campus. It closed in 1933.

Augsburg Seminary remained the school's name until 1942, when it was officially changed and expanded to Augsburg College and Theological Seminary, a name that had been informally used since the 1910s. When the Lutheran Free Church merged with the much larger American Lutheran Church (ALC) in 1963, Augsburg Seminary merged with the ALC's Luther Theological Seminary, later renamed Luther Seminary. The name of the remaining undergraduate college became Augsburg College. In 2017, the name of the school officially became Augsburg University.

August Weenaas was Augsburg's first president (1869–1876). Weenaas recruited two teachers from Norway—Sven Oftedal and Georg Sverdrup. These three men clearly articulated Augsburg's mission: to educate Norwegian Lutherans to minister to immigrants and to provide such "college" studies as would prepare students for theological study.

In 1874, they proposed a three-part plan: first, train ministerial candidates; second, prepare future theological students; third, educate the farmer, worker, and businessman. The statement stressed that a good education is also practical. Augsburg's next two presidents also emphatically rejected ivory tower concepts of education. This commitment to church and community has led to Augsburg's theme of over 130 years: Education for Service.

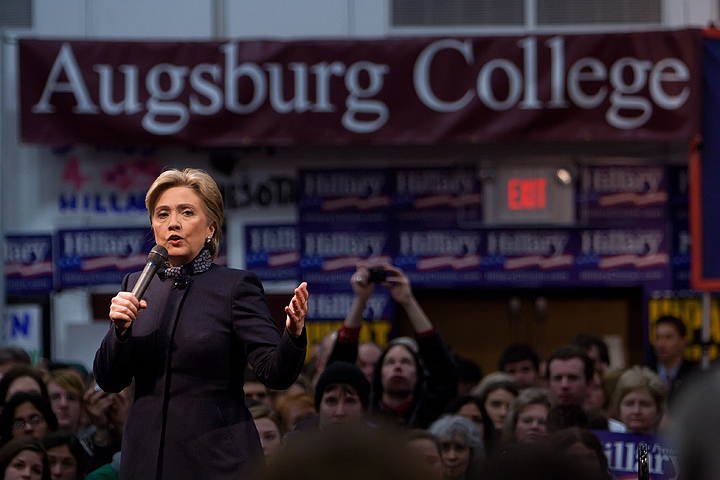
Hillary Clinton campaigning at Augsburg, two days before Super Tuesday 2008

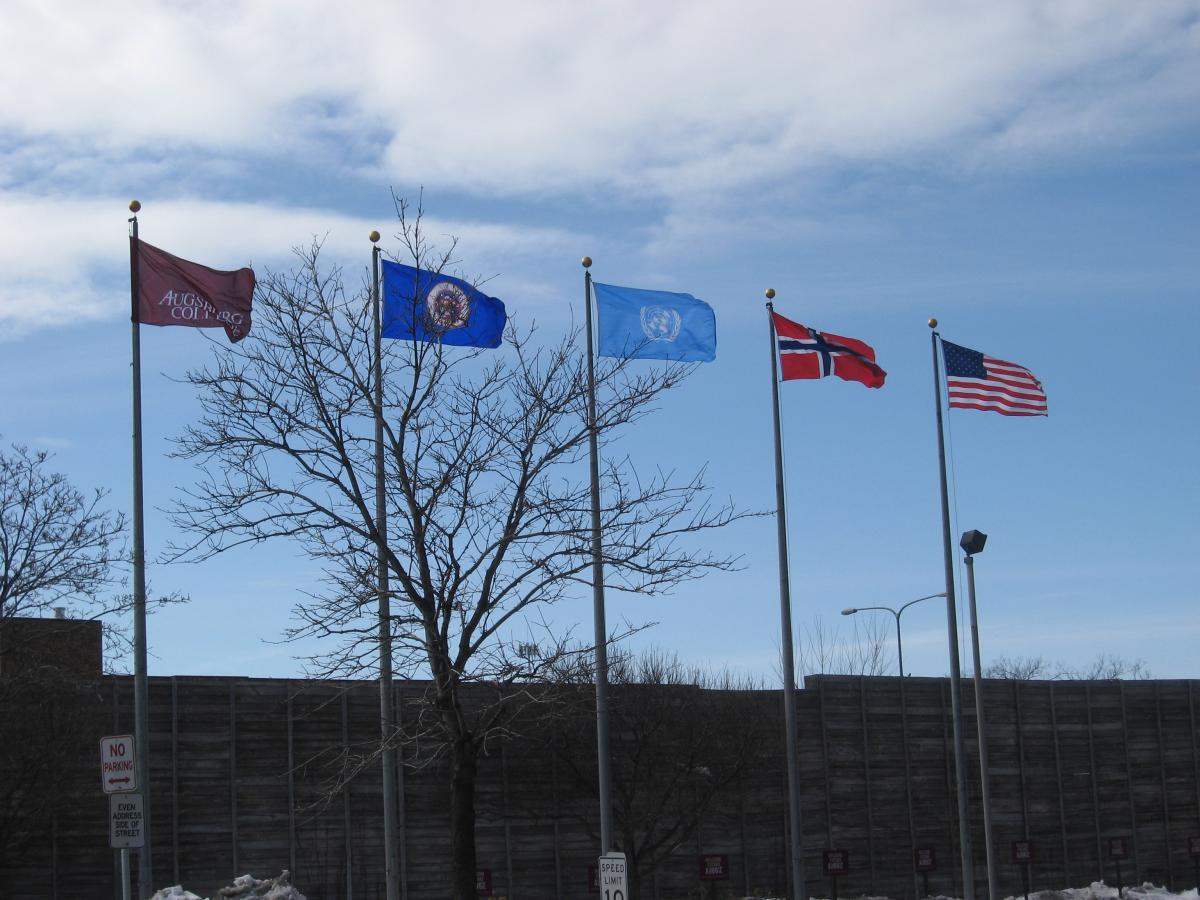
Flags fly at Augsburg, during the 25th annual Nobel Peace Prize Forum (2013).

This seminarian focus began to change after World War I. In 1911, George Sverdrup Jr. became president. He worked to develop college departments with an appeal to a broader range of students than just those intending to be ministers. In 1937, Augsburg elected Bernhard Christensen, an erudite and scholarly teacher, to be president (1938–1962). His involvement in ecumenical and civic circles made Augsburg a more visible part of church and city life. After World War II, Augsburg leaders made vigorous efforts to expand and improve academic offerings. By mid-century, the undergraduate college had become a larger part of the institution than the seminary and received the most attention.

As a result, Augsburg steadily added departments essential to a liberal arts college, offering a modern college program based on general education requirements and elective majors. Augsburg aims to reflect the commitment and dedication of its founders, who believed "an Augsburg education should be preparation for service in community and church" [by] "Providing an education grounded in vocational calling, that provides students both the theoretical learning and the practical experience to succeed in a global, diverse world."

=== Church affiliations ===
| Church | Years |
|---|---|
| Scandinavian Evangelical Lutheran Augustana Synod in North America | 1869–1870 |
| Conference of the Norwegian-Danish Evangelical Lutheran Church of America | 1870–1890 |
| United Norwegian Lutheran Church of America also Friends of Augsburg 1893–1897 | 1890–1897 |
| Lutheran Free Church | 1897–1963 |
| American Lutheran Church | 1963–1987 |
| Evangelical Lutheran Church in America | 1988–present |

=== Presidents ===
| Number | Name | Years | Notes |
|---|---|---|---|
| 1st | August Weenaas | 1869–1876 | |
| 2nd | Georg Sverdrup | 1876–1907 | |
| 3rd | Sven Oftedal | 1907–1911 | |
| 4th | George Sverdrup | 1911–1937 | Son of the second president |
| | Henry N. Hendrickson | 1937–1938 | Acting |
| 5th | Bernhard M. Christensen | 1938–1962 | |
| 6th | Leif S. Harbo | 1962–1963 | Interim |
| 7th | Oscar A. Anderson | 1963–1980 | |
| 8th | Charles S. Anderson | 1980–1997 | Not related to the preceding president |
| 9th | William V. Frame | 1997–2006 | First non-Norwegian |
| 10th | Paul C. Pribbenow | 2006– | |

== Campus ==
=== Residence halls ===
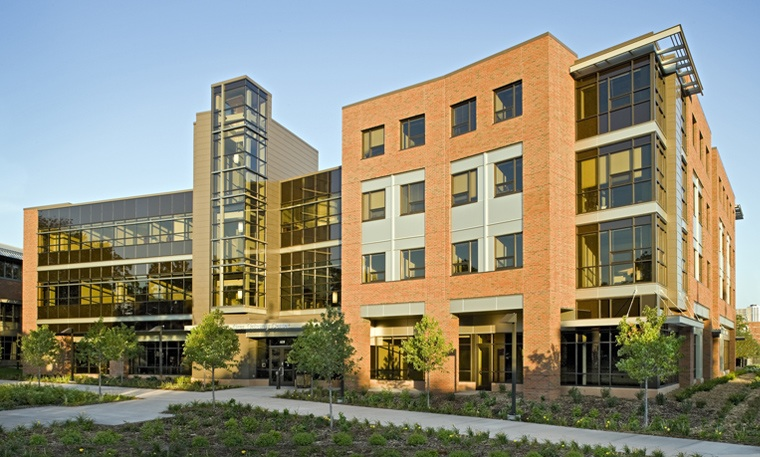
Oren Gateway Center

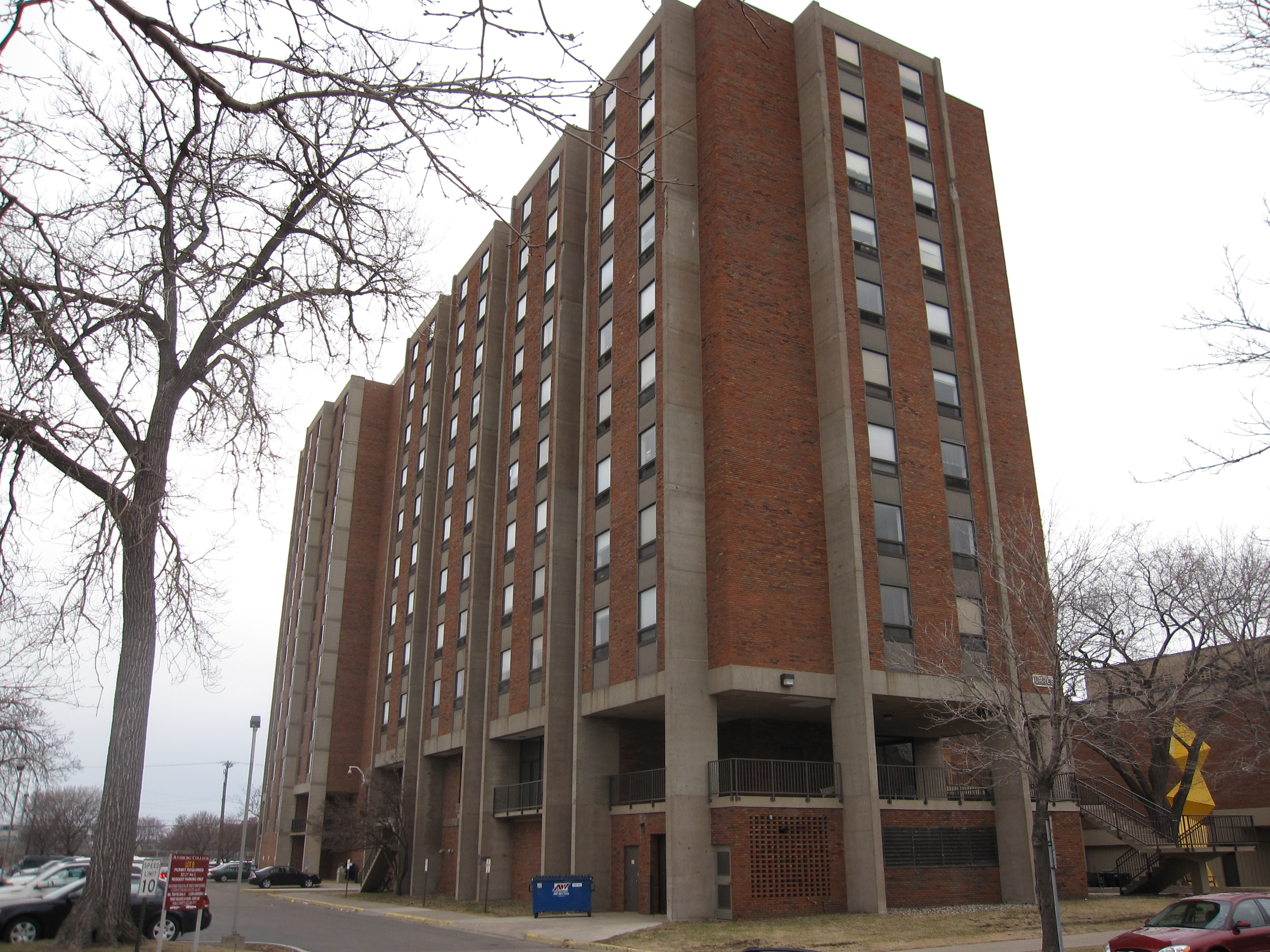
Urness Tower

Urness Hall is the first-year building. It has nine floors of traditional-style residence hall rooms (plus two other floors), with one coed floor. Each floor is led by a resident advisor (RA). Mortensen Hall (known as Mort) is connected to the Urness Hall lobby and has 13 floors of apartment-style housing (eight apartments on every floor). It is the tallest building on campus. Mortensen Hall is named for Gerda Mortensen, Dean of Women at Augsburg University from 1923 to 1964. Anderson Hall is a four-story building with four different styles of housing: single-person suites, four-person apartments, eight-person townhomes (two floors), and 15-person floorhouses. Martin Luther Residence Hall (also known as Luther Hall) was built in 1999 using state funding. It was originally named New Hall because there was no major contributor to name the hall for. It got its current name on October 1, 2007, when the completion of the Oren Gateway Center made the old name misleading. Luther Hall has studios and two-bedroom and four-bedroom apartments. The apartments all consist of single- or double-person rooms and have a full kitchen. The Oren Gateway Center is a substance-free residence hall and houses students in the StepUP program and other students who choose sober living. It has rooms for 106 students and also contains six classrooms and an art gallery.

=== Other buildings ===
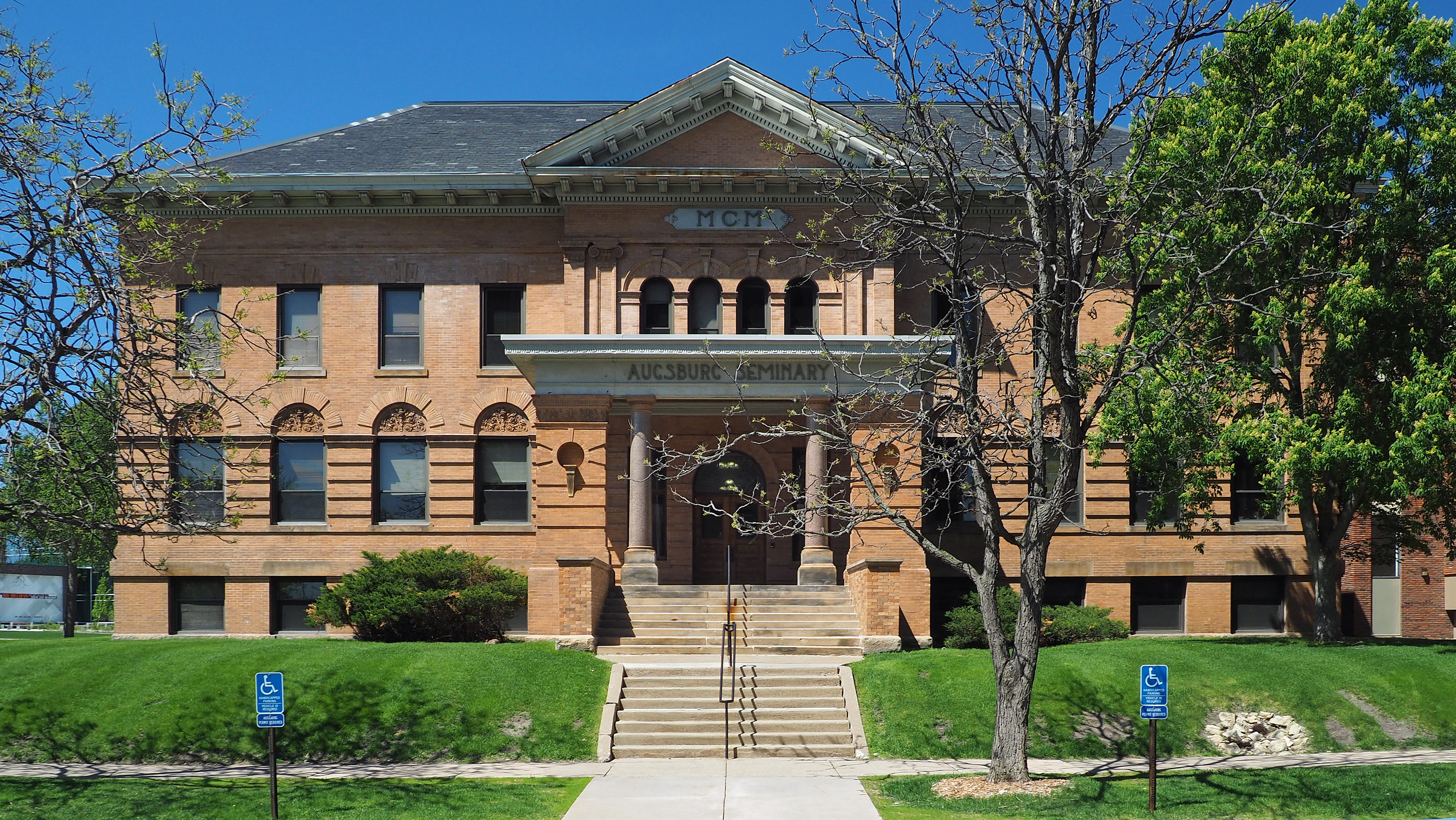
Augsburg's Old Main

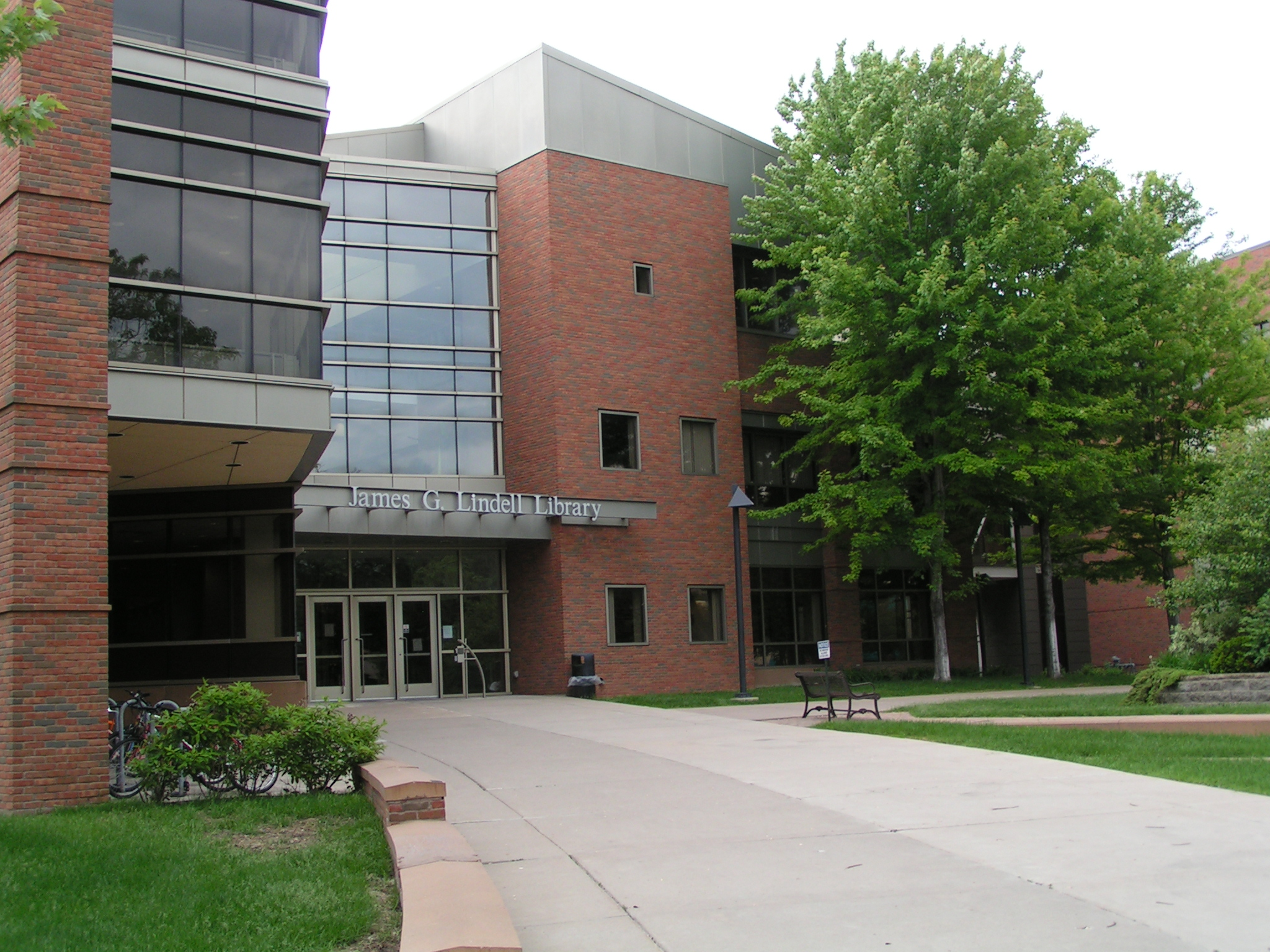
Entrance to Lindell Library

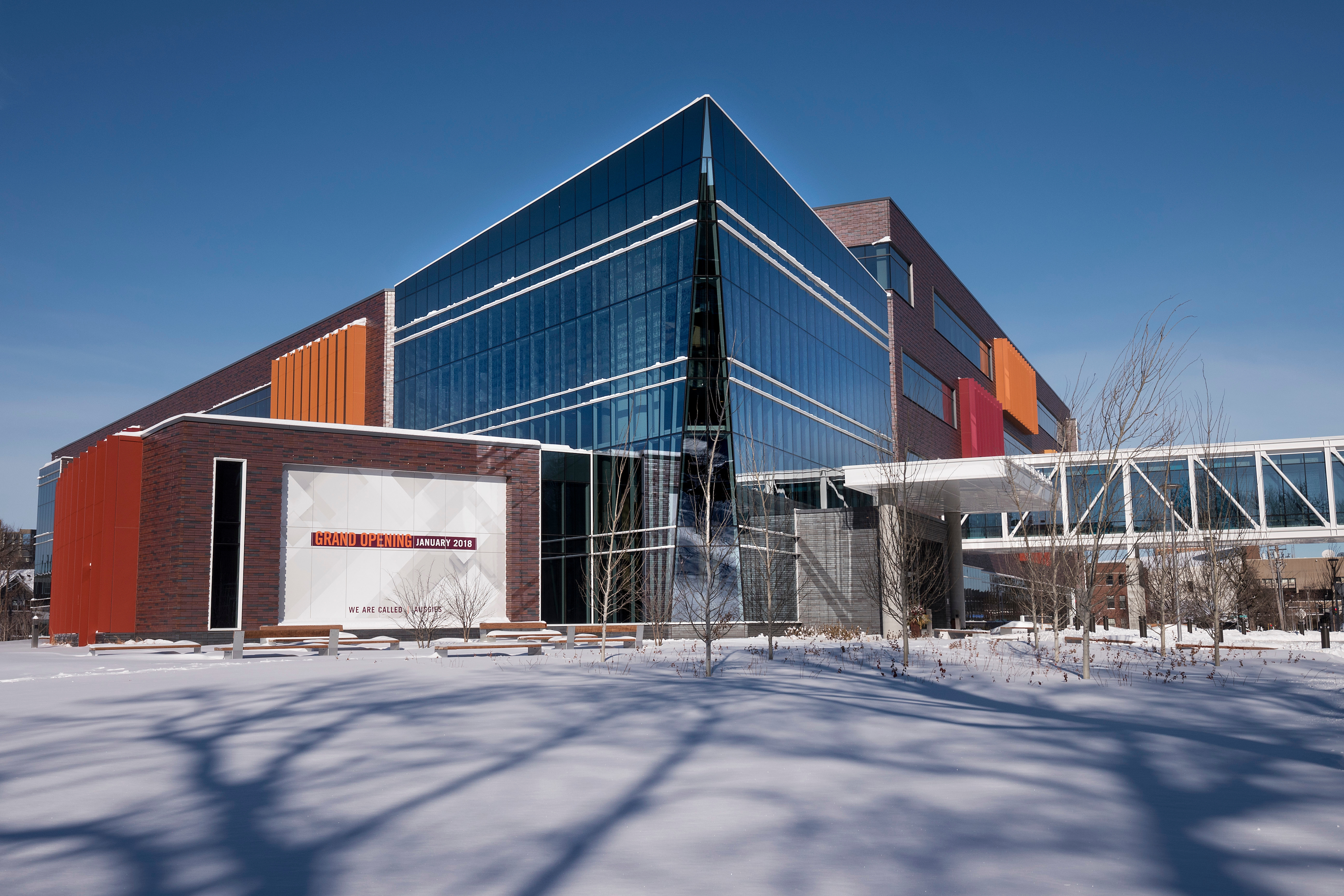
The Hagfors Center for Science, Business, and Religion

Old Main is the oldest building on campus and still in use. It is listed on the National Register of Historic Places. The Christensen Center contains admissions offices, the cafeteria, a coffee shop, computers, and an art gallery, It housed the bookstore until August 2007, after which the bookstore moved to the Oren Gateway Center. On March 28, 2008, a student lounge opened in the former bookstore space. It is connected by skyway to Urness Hall/Mortensen Hall.

Sverdrup Hall (formerly Sverdrup Library until the completion of Lindell Library in 1998) contains the Enrollment Center and Registrar's Office as well as several class rooms and computer labs on the upper level. The James G. Lindell Library has four levels containing approximately 190,000 items. The second floor is home to the Gage Center for Student Success, which has offices for Academic Advising, the Center for Learning and Accessible Student Services (CLASS), and Augsburg's offices of the Federal TRIO Programs. The library is connected to Sverdrup Hall, the Oren Gateway Center, and the Hagfors Center for Business, Science, and Religion by skyway.

The Foss Center for Worship, Drama and Communication contains the chapel, a theater, and several classrooms. Sverdrup Hall and Oftedal Memorial Hall contain offices for the college's professors and administration. The Norman and Evangeline Hagfors Center for Science, Business, and Religion is the newest building on campus and also the largest. Completed in 2018, the interdisciplinary Hagfors Center features 24 labs and 6,000 square feet of student-faculty research facilities, as well as a greenhouse, food lab, and large community garden.

== Academics ==
Augsburg University is accredited by the Higher Learning Commission. The student-faculty ratio at Augsburg University is 14:1, and the average class size is 20 students. Augsburg offers undergraduate degrees in over 50 major areas of study. The university also grants nine graduate degrees. Augsburg offers two doctoral degrees, the Doctor of Nursing Practice and Doctor of Clinical Psychology. Its most popular undergraduate majors are:

- Computer Science
- Biology
- Psychology
- Marketing
- Social Work

In 2023, the university announced the establishment of the John N. Schwartz '67 School of the Arts, an interdisciplinary home for the narrative, visual, and performing arts at Augsburg.

=== Reputation and rankings ===
According to the U.S. News & World Report 2024 rankings, Augsburg University was #24 among Best Regional Universities in the Midwest and #3 in top performers on social mobility. Augsburg University has been recognized as a Military Friendly® School (2024), one of the nation's top four-year institutions supporting community college transfer students by Phi Theta Kappa Society (2024), and one of Campus Pride's top 30 LGBTQ+ friendly colleges and universities (2023).

== Student life ==
=== Campus organizations ===
Augsburg's student body totals approximately 3,100 students from 36 states, more than 28 foreign countries, and 24 tribal nations/reservations. The on-campus diversity is enhanced by Augsburg's location in Cedar-Riverside, the Twin Cities' most culturally diverse neighborhood, which has the nation's largest concentration of Somali immigrants. One of the largest urban Native American populations is within one mile. Augsburg students have opportunities for involvement in more than 70 clubs and organizations, including student academic societies, publications, student government, Multicultural Life student groups, on-campus radio station, religious/spiritual groups, and more.

==== Queer Pride Alliance ====
Known as "Queer and Straight In Unity" (QSU) until 2014, and originally incorporated as "BAGLS" in 1988, Queer Pride Alliance (QPA) is Augsburg's lesbian, gay, bisexual, transgender, queer, intersex, and asexual support group. After the hostile campus environment towards LGBTQIA individuals culminated in several anti-LGBTQIA incidents in 2003, students occupied administrative offices to protest the university's lack of action. In response, Augsburg established the GLBTQIA Student Services office (today known as the LGBTQIA Student Services office), which became the primary point of contact and support for QSU and the LGBTQIA student body. QPA is advised by the director of the LGBTQIA Student Services office, which jointly provides the campus community with workshops, performances, weekly group meetings, and speakers, as well as exposing students to the wider Midwestern LGBTQIA rights movement by sponsoring retreats and trips to conferences. Today, Augsburg is certified Reconciling in Christ by ReconcilingWorks, which means that in accordance with its theological values, it welcomes and actively affirms "all people in regard to their gender expression, gender identity, and sexual orientation".

... we affirm the following: that people of all sexual orientations and gender identities share the worth that comes from being unique individuals created by God; that people of all sexual orientations and gender identities are welcome with the Augsburg community; and that as members of this community, people of all sexual orientations and gender identities are expected and encouraged to share in the common life of this university.

— Augsburg University Reconciling in Christ Statement

=== Centers of Commitment ===
Augsburg houses four Centers of Commitment that provide student services, academic opportunities, and co-curricular programming:

- The Clair and Gladys Strommen Center for Meaningful Work
- The Bernhard Christensen Center for Vocation
- The Center for Global Education and Experience
- The Sabo Center for Democracy and Citizenship

A fifth center, Interfaith at Augsburg, was established in 2019 to promote interreligious leadership on campus and nationally.

=== StepUP ===
StepUP at Augsburg University is one of the nation's oldest and most comprehensive residential programs students in recovery from drug and alcohol abuse. The program provides a sober residence in the Oren Gateway Center. It claims an excellent success rate, with more than 700 alumni since 1997.

=== Community engagement ===
Augsburg's Health Commons sites are nursing-led drop-in centers led and organized by nursing faculty members, nursing and physician assistant volunteers, students, and community members. Services to address issues including blood pressure, nutrition, medication, social isolation, minor injuries, and diabetes are provided free of charge to individuals from diverse cultural and socioeconomic backgrounds, many of whom are marginally housed.

Campus Kitchen at Augsburg University works to make healthy and culturally appropriate food accessible on campus and in and around the Cedar Riverside Neighborhood. Programs include the Campus Cupboard food shelf, community food access initiatives, and food education.

== Athletics ==
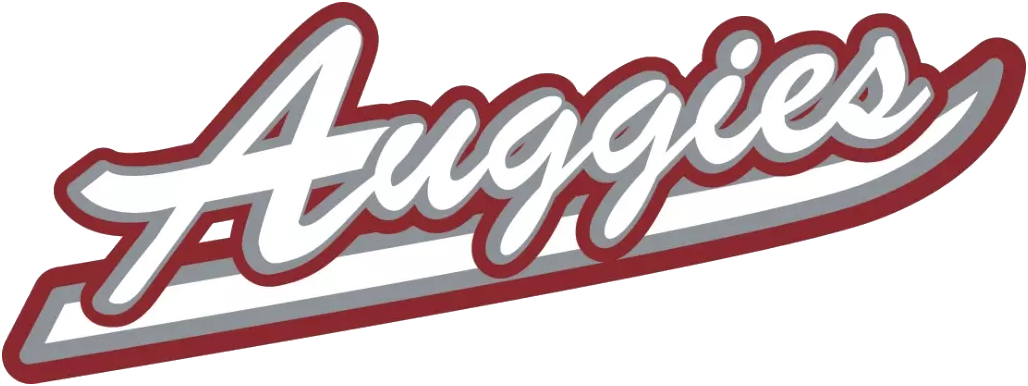
Augsburg athletics script logo

The Augsburg Auggies are a member of the Minnesota Intercollegiate Athletic Conference (MIAC). Augsburg University participates in NCAA Division III Athletics. The wrestling team has won fifteen NCAA Division III National team wrestling champions: 1991, 1993, 1995, 1997, 1998, 2000, 2001, 2002, 2005, 2007, 2010, 2015, 2018, 2023, and 2024. The men's hockey team had won 3 NAIA national ice hockey championships in 1978, 1981 and 1982.

The Augsburg hockey team was selected by the United States Amateur Hockey Association to represent the United States at the 1928 Winter Olympics. However, the American Olympic Committee, led by Douglas MacArthur, refused to certify the team due to the lack of Olympic trials. As a result, the United States did not have an Olympic hockey team in 1928.

- Men's varsity sports (9): baseball, basketball, cross country, football, golf, ice hockey, soccer, track & field, wrestling
- Women's varsity sports (11): basketball, cross country, golf, ice hockey, lacrosse, soccer, softball, swimming, track & field, volleyball, wrestling

=== Conference championships ===
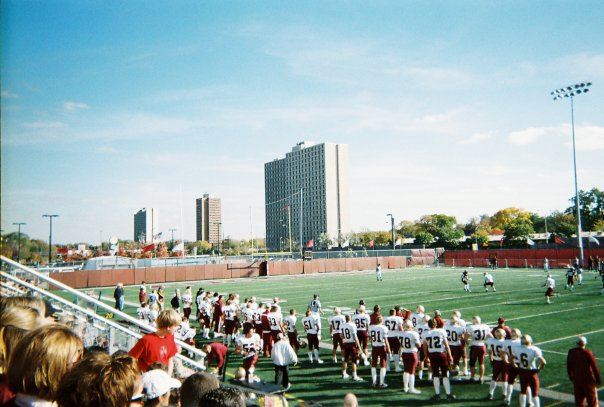
Edor Nelson Field at Augsburg

MIAC Championships
| Season | Sport | Titles | Year(s) |
|---|---|---|---|
| Fall | football | 2 | 1928c, 1997 |
| Fall | soccer (women's) | 3 | 2014, 2017, 2019 |
| Fall | soccer (men's) | 4 | 1973, 1974, 1975, 1980 |
| Fall | golf (men's) | 1 | 1995, 2015 |
| Winter | hockey (men's) | 8 | 1928, 1977c, 1978, 1979, 1980, 1981c, 1982, 1998c, 2016, 2017, 2018, 2019 |
| Winter | hockey (women's) | 2 | 1999c, 2000c |
| Winter | basketball (men's) | 13 | 1927, 1946c, 1963, 1964, 1965, 1975c, 1976, 1977, 1980, 1984, 1985, 1998, 1999 |
| Winter | wrestling* (men's) | 31 | 1961, 1968, 1969, 1970, 1975, 1976, 1977, 1978, 1979, 1980, 1982, 1983, 1984, 1985, 1987, 1988, 1989, 1990, 1991, 1992, 1993, 1994, 1995, 1996, 1997, 1998, 1999, 2000, 2001, 2002, 2003 |
| Spring | baseball | 10 | 1931, 1943, 1947, 1948, 1959c, 1961, 1963, 1973, 1975, 1987 |
| Spring | softball | 3 | 1982, 1983, 1984 |
| Spring | tennis (men's) | 3 | 1948 doubles, 1951 single, 1968 doubles |
| Total | | 77 | |

- "c" indicates co-champions.

== Notable alumni ==
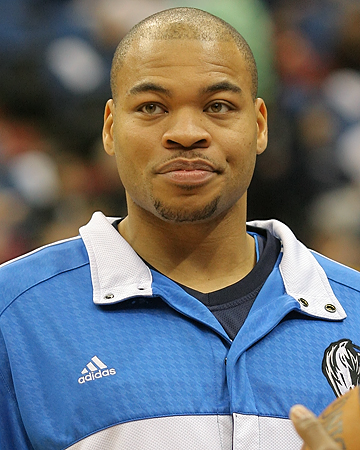
Former NBA player Devean George, 1999

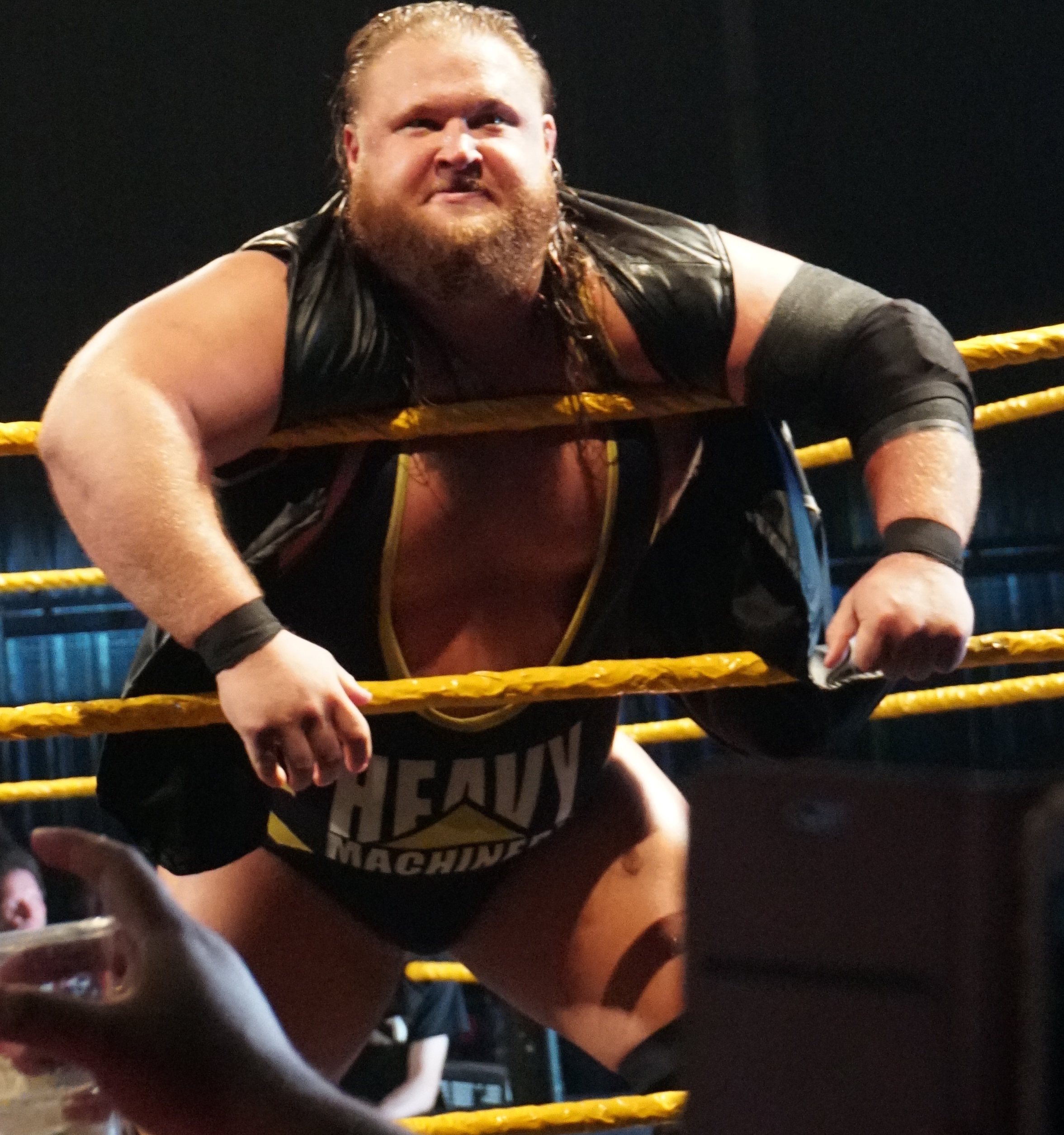
Professional wrestler Otis Dozovic, 2011

- Peter Agre, M.D., 1970, 2003 Nobel Prize winner in Chemistry and faculty member at the Johns Hopkins University School of Medicine
- Susan Allen, 1992, first Native American woman elected to the Minnesota state legislature, and first openly lesbian Native American to win election to a state legislature
- Jill Billings, 1990, Wisconsin State Assembly
- David Brisbin, actor who appeared on Hey Dude and ER
- Herbert W. Chilstrom, 1954, retired (and the first) Presiding Bishop of the ELCA
- Otis Dozovic, 2011, WWE professional wrestler, 2017 Rookie of the Year
- Devean George, 1999, former National Basketball Association player for the Los Angeles Lakers, the Dallas Mavericks, and the Golden State Warriors
- Rev. Mark Hanson, 1971, former Presiding Bishop of the ELCA
- CJ Holstine, 2007, winner of Education Minnesota's 2018 Minnesota Teacher of the Year award
- Roger Huerta, former wrestler, mixed martial artist once competing in the Ultimate Fighting Championship and Bellator Fighting Championship
- Marcus LeVesseur, 2007, 4-time Wrestling National Champion (2003–05, 2007), 4-time Minnesota State High School Wrestling Champion (1998–2001); the first Division III wrestler with four national titles; the second college wrestler ever to finish his career unbeaten and untied, with a 155–0 career record; currently competing in mixed martial arts
- Lute Olson, 1956, basketball coach at University of Iowa and Arizona, coached Arizona to a national championship
- Anne Panning, 1988, writer, winner of 2006 Flannery O'Connor Award for Super America
- Oscar S. Paulson, 1914, Wisconsin State Senate
- James Pederson, 1934, played in the National Football League 1930–1932 with the Minneapolis Red Jackets, Frankford Yellow Jackets, and Chicago Bears
- Martin Sabo, 1959, former Minnesota State Representative (1961–1978) and U.S. Congress Representative (1979–2007)
- Dua Saleh, 2017, a Sudanese-American musician, actor, and activist
- Chris Stedman, Augsburg professor of religion and philosophy
- Dave Stevens, 1991, amputee athlete born without legs, played college football; the only congenital amputee to ever play college sports
- Jane Jeong Trenka, activist, author, and winner of a Minnesota Book Award

== See also ==
- List of colleges and universities in Minnesota
- Higher education in Minnesota
