= Chris Forhan =

American poet and professor

Chris Forhan is a poet, memoirist, and professor at Butler University, author most recently, of My Father Before Me, published by Simon and Schuster. Each of his full-length poetry collections has won an award: Black Leapt In, The Actual Moon, The Actual Stars, and Forgive Us Our Happiness, which won the Barrow Street Press Poetry Prize, the Morse Poetry Prize, and Bakeless Prize, respectively.

Forhan has had poems published in The Best American Poetry 2008, AGNI online, Poetry, Slate, and The Paris Review. He has received a fellowship from the National Endowment of the Arts and two Pushcart Prizes. He has also won the Washington State Book Award and the Best Book of Indiana Award. His books have been reviewed in Publishers Weekly, Kirkus Reviews, Library Journal, and New York Journal of Books. He has been interviewed by Superstition Review, Bellingham Review, and Midwestern Gothic.

== Personal life ==
He was born and raised in Seattle, Washington. He is married to the poet Alessandra Lynch, and they live in Indianapolis with their sons.

== Published works ==
Memoir

- My Father Before Me: A Memoir (Charles Scribner’s Sons, 2016)

Full-length Poetry Collections

- Black Leapt In (Barrow Street Press, 2009)
- The Actual Moon, the Actual Stars (Northeastern University Press, 2003)
- Forgive Us Our Happiness (University Press of New England, 1999)

Chapbook

- Ransack and Dance: Poems (Silver Birch Press, 2013)
- X: A Poem (Floating Bridge Press, 2000)
- Crumbs of Bread (March Street Press, 1995)
