= Lisa Gluskin Stonestreet =

American poet (born 1968)

- Born: Lisa Gluskin; January 31, 1968 (age 58)
- Writing career
- Genre: Poetry
- Notable awards: Morse Poetry Prize, Frost Place Chapbook Prize

Lisa Gluskin Stonestreet (born January 31, 1968) is an American poet. Stonestreet's second book, The Greenhouse, was awarded the 2014 Frost Place Chapbook Prize and published by Bull City Press in August 2014. Her first book, Tulips, Water, Ash, was published by Northeastern University Press, and chosen by Jean Valentine as the last Morse Poetry Prize, before its suspension in 2009 .

== Education and career ==
Stonestreet is a graduate of Yale University, receiving a BA in contemporary American literature, and she received an MFA in Creative Writing from the MFA Program for Writers at Warren Wilson College where she received the Jacob K. Javits Fellowship in Creative Writing. Her poems have been anthologized in Best New Poets 2005 and Best New Poets 2006 (Samovar Press), and they have appeared in literary journals and magazines, including The Iowa Review, Bellingham Review, Blackbird, and Third Coast. Her honors include fellowships from Millay Colony for the Arts and Vermont Studio Center. She lives with her husband and son in Portland, Oregon, where she works as a writer, teacher, and editor.

== Awards ==
- 2014 Bull City Press Frost Place Chapbook Award
- 2013 Cream City Review Poetry Prize
- 2009 Samuel French Morse Poetry Prize
- 2004 Jacob K. Javits Fellowship in Creative Writing (MFA Program for Writers at Warren Wilson College)
- 2003 Universities West Press Emily Dickinson Award
- 2001 San Jose Center For Poetry and Literature Poetry Prize
- 2001 James Duval Phelan Literary Award (San Francisco Foundation)
