= Sam Abrams =

American poet

- Born: November 18, 1935
- Died: 2023 (aged 87–88)
- Occupation: Poet
- Spouse: Barbara O. Leeb
- Children: Ezra and Josh
- Writing career
- Subjects: Politics, pot, the classics, the Blues, jazz, and the human condition

Sam Abrams (1935–2023) was an American poet, classicist, teacher and activist. A "favorite poet" of fellow poet Thomas E. Weatherly Jr., Abrams was described as writing the:

[P]oems too of a classicist, on familiar terms with Sappho, Archilochus, Horace, Socrates regulars in the audience along with Miles, Billie, Bessie, Woody hard listeners for poems that are bluesy, bopsy, beat. Whitmanesque, funny, generous, passionately committed, intellectually rigorous ... in-your-face poems, that can only . . . be read aloud.

Sometimes described as "postbeat," Abrams was an original workshop leader at the Poetry Project at St. Mark's Church in New York City and a Fulbright professor of American literature at the University of Athens, Greece. In addition to authoring several books and serving as both editor and critic, Abrams "regularly published for over 40 years in numerous journals and anthologies, including the Paris Review, the University of Iowa's Walt Whitman Quarterly Review and a chaplet of eight poems for the Backwood Broadsides series."

A Journal of Letters and Life described Abrams as an "unrepentant revolutionary and classics professor." A patriot who believed in both "flag etiquette" and civil disobedience, Abrams also owned an off-the-rack DEA jacket, published a book of poetry about pot, and participated in the 1967 Angry Arts Week alongside 600 New York artists. In 2008, more than 40 years later, poets Ed Sanders, Anne Waldman and Amiri Baraka celebrated him with the book Uncensored Songs: A tribute to Sam Abrams.

== Academic career ==
In 1958, Abrams launched his academic career at Drew University in Madison, NJ as both instructor and the head of the classics department. After his position as a Distinguished Visiting Fulbright Professor ended, Abrams was hired to teach for the Department of Language and Literature at the Rochester Institute of Technology (RIT) in 1978. A long-time member of Rochester Poets, Abrams founded the "literary journal Signatures in 1986, and convinced Allen Ginsberg, Gary Snyder and Ted Turner to visit and speak on campus." In 2005, he retired and was named a professor emeritus.

== Bibliography ==
- Barbara. Ferry Press, 1966. ASIN: B000UG33B2
- The Neglected Walt Whitman: Vital Texts ed. Sam Abrams. Four Walls Eight Windows, 1993. (Sixty-five poems, fragments, and three prose pieces by Whitman.) ISBN 978-0941423908
- The Old Pothead Poems. Creative Arts Book Co., 2003. ISBN 978-0887394805
- The Post-American Cultural Congress. Bobbs-Merrill, 1974. ISBN 978-0672512506
- Book of Days. Dedicated to Black Mountain poet and translator Paul Blackburn, and archived in the Paul Blackburn Tape Collection at the Library UC San Diego.

== Education ==
Born in Brooklyn, New York, Abrams attended the James Madison High School, was graduated with an A.B. from Brooklyn College and earned an M.A. from the University of Illinois at Urbana–Champaign.

== Personal ==
Married to fellow New Yorker Barbara, the couple had two sons and two grandchildren. With the exception of a few years in New Hampshire, Abrams and his family lived in Rochester, New York, and spent two decades splitting their time between New York and Chania, Crete. Predeceased by his wife, Abrams died in the fall of 2023.
