= Paul C. Pribbenow =

American academic administrator

10th President of Augsburg University
- Incumbent
- Assumed office 2006

President of Rockford University
- In office 2002–2006

Personal details
- Education: Luther College; University of Chicago

Paul C. Pribbenow is an American academic administrator, currently serving as the 10th president of Augsburg University in Minneapolis.

== Education ==
Pribbenow earned a Bachelor of Arts degree from Luther College, followed by a master's degree and PhD in social ethics from the University of Chicago.

== Career ==
Prior to joining Augsburg University, Pribbenow served as president of Rockford University from 2002 to 2006. He also served as a research fellow, Dean for College Advancement, and secretary of the Board of Trustees at Wabash College. He was vice president of the School of the Art Institute of Chicago and associate dean of the University of Chicago Divinity School.

Pribbenow took office as president of Augsburg in 2006.
