= Lindell Library =

Coordinates: 44°58′0.50″N 93°14′30.58″W

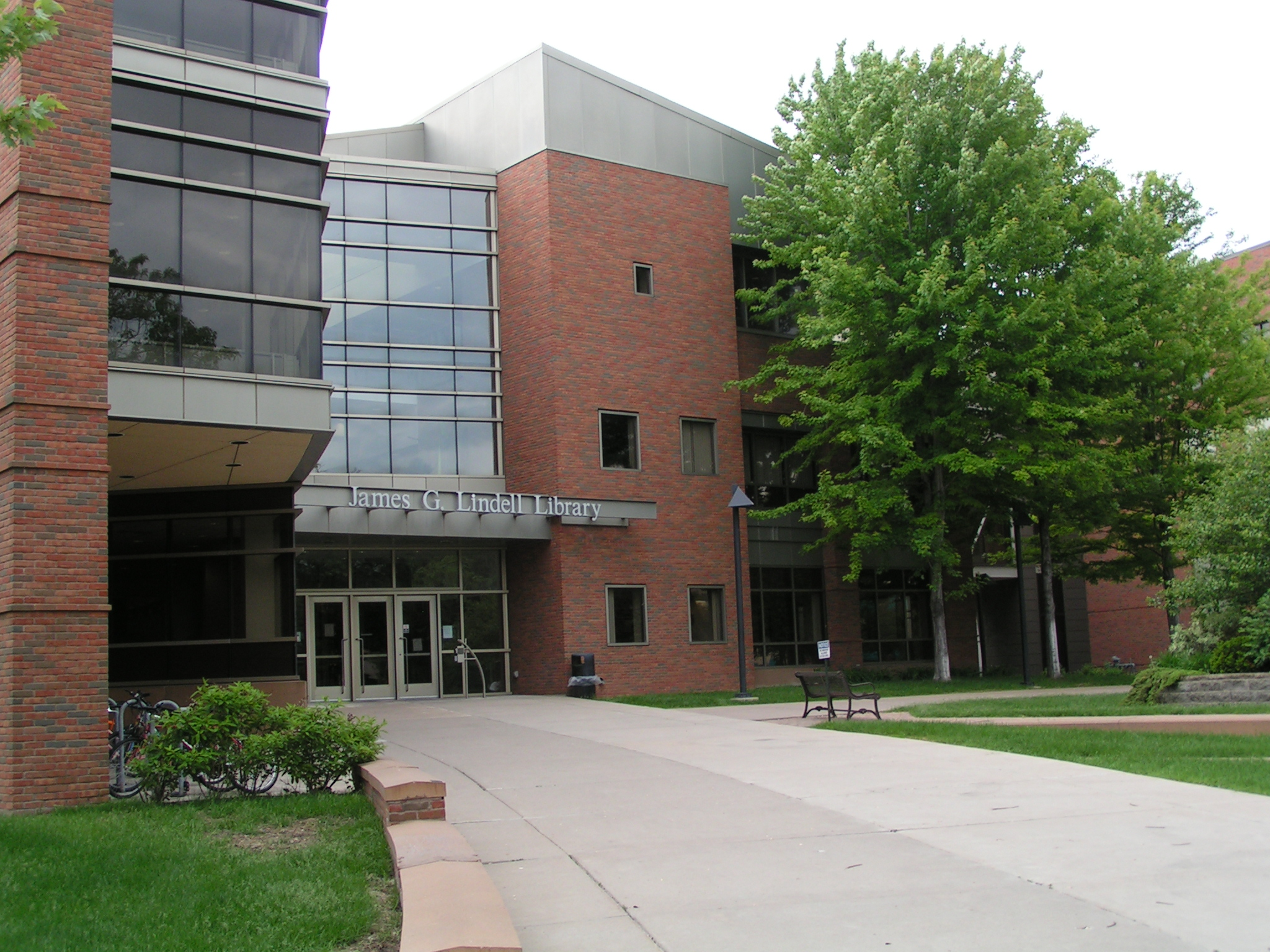
Entrance to the library

Lindell Library, also known as the James G. Lindell Family Library, is the academic library of Augsburg University, a liberal arts college in Minneapolis, Minnesota. The library is named for the James G. Lindell family. James G. Lindell attended Augsburg from 1942–1943 and served on the Board of Regents from 1970-1982. The library was dedicated in the fall of 1997. Lindell Library serves the Augsburg community, including students, faculty, staff, and alumni.

There are four levels in the library, equaling 73,000 square feet. Print materials are located on all four floors, computer labs are on the main and second levels, the school's archives are on the lower level, and group study rooms are on the third floor. With a large skylight and open architectural structure, the library lets in significant amounts of daylight.

Lindell Library holds over 190,000 physical items. The library also has access to electronic resources, such as scholarly articles and ebooks. In 2007, the reference area was reconfigured into a Learning Commons. In addition to the Learning Commons’ research and technical support, Lindell Library provides digital reference services. The library has “Ask a Librarian” chat reference and reference text capabilities.

== History ==
Augsburg University's first official library was housed in the basement of Old Main. The library had 476 volumes. As the college expanded, there became a need for a larger library space to adequately house the increasing number of students and books. In 1954 the college broke ground for a new library and the Sverdrup Library opened in August 1955. Once again, the library became too small for the growing print collection and the student body. In the 1990s the collection had grown to 165,000. Sverdrup Library was also too outdated for growing technology. The college broke ground for the James G. Lindell Family Library in 1996.
