= Poetry Central =

Performance poetry collective

Poetry Central was a loose collection of performance poets and audiences in the area of Rochester, N.Y. Performances and readings were presented publicly under its sponsorship from about 1972 to about 1986, originally at the First Unitarian Universalist Church on Clinton Avenue, although there were some long periods when the collective was unable to find a space for presentation of these readings.

== Activities ==
The group was originally formed by nationally recognized poet and museum arts teacher James Lavilla-Havelin. The regular contributors to this collective included William Pruitt, Diane Baum; David Shevin, David Michael Nixon, Bobby Johnson, Wally Butts, and Joe M. Connelly. Poets reading at spaces provided by this collective included Anne Waldman; Michael McClure; Gregory Corso; Robert Creeley; Gary Snyder; Diane Wakoski; Robert Bly; and occasionally fiction writers would appear as well, such as award-winning mystery writer Edward D. Hoch; as well as regionally known writers from the western N.Y. area, such as Buffalo playwright Emanuel Fried.

The collective was well known for providing the Rochester area with a stage for open readings, where writers of every kind could present their work in recital to the public. Activities also included sponsorship for readings and the teaching of writing poetry in public schools; support for publications by local authors; introduction of poetry readings in local bars and coffee-houses; the occasional public-access television broadcast of readings; placement of poetry on sign-cards in high-profile public places, such as bus-stops; attempts to network with similar collectives in other cities; and release of the Poetry Central Newsletter.

== Context ==
The collective was heavily influenced by the poetics of the Beat Generation, and by the poetics that developed out of that movement, spreading throughout the so-called 'cultural revolution' of the 1960s. However, money was always tight, and contributor personalities occasionally clashed; but the collective really began to fall apart during the presidency of Ronald Reagan, when the culture and general tenor of American life began to drift seriously right-ward. Since Poetry Central represented a democratic approach to poetics, community interest in the collective dwindled as Americans re-defined themselves as essentially selfish and profit-driven, and unconcerned with the content or outcome of cultural conflict. By the mid-1990s, American poetry as a viable mode of cultural change and exchange had been disempowered. Poetry itself continues; but regardless of the need for collectives such as Poetry Central, the will does not appear to be there, in many areas of America, including western N.Y.

Although few of the original contributors to Poetry Central remain in the Rochester area, and their continuing poetic activity is largely unknown, Poetry Central does appear to have left a legacy of hope for writers in the Rochester area, as a moment when poets came together and defined themselves, without surrender to cultural definitions surrounding them.
