= Robin Hemley =

American novelist

- Hemley at a music class for DO-OVER
- Born: New York, U.S.
- Education: Indiana University (BA); University of Iowa (MFA)
- Occupations: Writer, academic
- Awards: Guggenheim Fellowship; Pushcart Prize

Robin Hemley is an American academic and writer of nonfiction and fiction. He is the author of 15 books, and has had work published in The New York Times, New York Magazine, and several literary magazines. After several previous academic posts, Hemley joined the faculty of Long Island University in 2020.

== Early life and education ==
Robin Hemley was born in New York City to a Jewish family. His father, Cecil Hemley, was co-founder, with Arthur A. Cohen, of Noonday Press. His mother, Elaine Gottlieb Hemley, published fiction and poetry.

Hemley graduated from Indiana University Bloomington with a B.A. in comparative literature and from the University of Iowa with an MFA in Fiction. He earned a PhD in creative practice from the University of New South Wales in 2020.

== Career ==
At Western Washington University, Hemley edited The Bellingham Review for five years and founded the Tobias Wolff Award for Fiction and the Annie Dillard Award for Nonfiction.

In 2004, he began teaching at the University of Iowa, where he was hired as the Director of the Nonfiction Writing Program, and since 2000 he has taught at Vermont College of Fine Arts, where he served as Faculty Chair for three years. At the University of Iowa, he founded the NonfictioNOW Conference in 2005.

From 2013 to 2019, he was the director of the Writing Program, Writer-in-Residence, and Professor of Humanities at Yale-NUS College in Singapore.

In 2020, Hemley joined the faculty of Long Island University, where his is director and Polk Professor in Residence of the George Polk School of Communications.

=== Writing ===
Hrmlry has had work published in The New York Times, New York Magazine, Creative Nonfiction, Brevity, Conjunctions, The Sun, and Narrative, among others.

== Awards ==
His writing awards include three Pushcart Prizes in fiction and nonfiction, first place in the Nelson Algren Award for Short Fiction from The Chicago Tribune, and the Independent Press Book Award for Nonfiction.

== Selected works ==
Fiction

- The Mouse Town and Other Stories (Word Beat Press, 1987) ISBN 978-0912527062
- All You Can Eat (Atlantic Monthly Press, 1988) ISBN 978-0871132611
- The Last Studebaker, a novel (Graywolf Press, 1992) ISBN 978-0253000125
- The Big Ear, stories (Blair, 1997) ISBN 978-0895871640
- Reply All: Stories (Indiana University Press, 2012) ISBN 978-0253001801

Non-fiction

- Nola: A Memoir of Faith, Art, and Madness (Graywolf Press, 1998) ISBN 978-1609381790
- Invented Eden: The Elusive, Disputed History of the Tasaday (Bison Books, 2003) ISBN 978-0803273634
- Extreme Fiction: Fabulists and Formalists, with Michael Martone (Pearson Education, 2003) ISBN 978-0321179722
- Do-Over! In which a forty-eight-year-old father of three returns to kindergarten, summer camp, the prom, and other embarrassments (Little, Brown and Company, 2009) ISBN 978-0316020602
- A Field Guide for Immersion Writing: Memoir, Journalism, and Travel (University of Georgia Press, 2012) ISBN 978-0820342559
- I'll Tell You Mine: Thirty Years of Essays from the Iowa Nonfiction Writing Program, editor, with Hope Edelman (University of Chicago Press, 2015) ISBN 978-0226306339
- Turning Life into Fiction (Chinese edition, Renmin University Press, 2018)
- Borderline Citizen: Dispatches from the Outskirts of Nationhood (University of Nebraska Press, 2020) ISBN 978-1496220417
- The Art and Craft of Asian Stories: A Writer’s Guide and Anthology, with Xu Xi (Bloomsbury Publishing, 2021) ISBN 978-1350076549

Short stories

- "All Good Things are Surprises" (Narrative, 2007)
