= Door of Hope =

Vibrant church and community hub in South Launceston, Tasmania

General information
- Location: South Launceston, Tasmania
- Coordinates: 41.4546162°S 147.1398909°E
- Completed: 1920s
- Opened: August 1923

Website
- door-of-hope.org

The Door of Hope is a church and community hub, located in South Launceston, Tasmania, Australia. The Door of Hope was previously called the Patons & Baldwins Woollen Mill before being renamed to the Coats Patons Textile Mill before closing down in 1997 before reopening as the Door of Hope.

The building is primarily made out of brick.

== History ==
Before being a church and community hub, it was a mill factory called Patons & Baldwins Woollen Mill, which opened in August 1923. At the time, about two thousand employees worked at the Patons & Baldwins Woollen Mill in the 1960s, which was the largest employer of women in Tasmania. In 1969, the mill was renamed to the Coats Patons Textile Mill. In 1987, the building was renamed to the Coats Patons Handknittings since it had moved from being a mill to a craft wools centre. In 1997, the factory shut down, which remained untouched for about seven or eight years before becoming the Door of Hope church.

From 2020 to 2021, the Tasmanian Government set up a COVID-19 pandemic vaccination centre.

In 2023, LexFun, an indoor playground and trampoline playground that reopened in the Door of Hope after closing from its original location near Elphin.
