= Samuel French Morse =

American poet

Samuel French Morse (1916–1985) was an American poet and teacher. He had the Samuel French Morse Poetry Prize named in his honor, which lasted from 1983–2009. The prize was for a first or second book of poems by a U.S. poet, with a $1000 cash award, and publication of the winning manuscript by Northeastern University Press/UPNE.

== Life ==
Samuel French Morse was born in Salem, Massachusetts. He graduated from Dartmouth College in 1936 and from Harvard University in 1938, and from Boston University in 1952.

From 1962 until 1985, he taught at Northeastern University.

He married Jane, and they summered at Hancock, Maine. His first book, Time of Year, had a preface by Wallace Stevens.

== Awards ==
He won the Emily Clark Balch and the Arthur Davison Ficke prizes for poetry.

== Works ==
- "A Friendly Visit, Poems for Robert Frost (Chapbook 5): Place and Time" (PDF). Beloit Poetry Journal. 7: 36–37. Summer 1957. Archived from the original (PDF) on December 11, 2005.

=== Poetry ===
- Time of Year: A First Book of Poems. The Cummington press. 1943.
- The Scattered Causes: Poems. A. Swallow. 1955.
- The Changes. A. Swallow. 1964.
- All in a Suitcase. Illustrated by Barbara Cooney. Little, Brown. 1966.
- The Sequences. Northeastern University. 1978.
- Guy Rotella, ed. (1995). Collected Poems. National Poetry Foundation. ISBN 978-0-943373-34-8.

=== Criticism ===
- SAMUEL FRENCH MORSE (October 3, 1954). "A Poet Who Speaks the Poem as It Is". The New York Times.

=== Biography ===
- Samuel French Morse (1970). Wallace Stevens Life As Poetry. Pegasus.

== Reviews ==
Mr. Morse doesn't answer these questions. Probably, they can't be answered, like "Is my thought a memory, not alive?" or "Is the spot on the floor, there, wine or blood/And whichever it may be, is it mine?" But his book does belong on that short, distinguished shelf including the collected poems, Holly Stevens's Letters of Wallace Stevens and Helen Hennessy Vendler's On Extended Wings: Wallace Stevens' Longer Poems. And, who knows, maybe "They will get it straight one day at the Sorbonne./We shall return at twilight from the lecture/Pleased that the irrational is rational. . ." And Wallace Stevens "will have stopped revolving except in crystal." I hope not.
