= Nebraska Center for the Book =

The Nebraska Center for the Book is the Nebraska affiliate of the Center for the Book in the Library of Congress. It bestows out the annual Nebraska Book Awards in conjunction with the Nebraska Library Commission.

The Center's goal is to bring "readers, writers, booksellers, librarians, publishers, printers, educators, and scholars" together to excite interest in "the written word".

== Awards ==
=== Nebraska Book Awards ===
The Nebraska book awards are given annually to books written by Nebraska authors, set in Nebraska, related to Nebraska or published by Nebraska-based publishers. Prizes are awarded in the categories of, Nonfiction, Fiction, Children/Young Adult, Cover/Design/Illustration, Anthology and Poetry.

In 2019 the Center was at the center of a political controversy when Governor Pete Ricketts refused to sign the customary proclamation declaring the winner on the grounds that the winning book, This Blessed Earth, by written by Nebraska journalist and author Ted Genoways, is a "political activist" whose book is "divisive." According to the Associated Press, Genoways has been critical of Obama administration policies, of the fact that Nebraska has an entirely Republican congressional delegation and of the Keystone XL pipeline.

=== Mildred Bennett Award ===
The Mildred Bennett Award is given to an individual for a significant contribution to the Nebraska literary tradition. It is named in honor of Mildred Bennett, who was the founding president of Nebraska's Willa Cather Pioneer Memorial and Educational Foundation.

== See also ==
- Books in the United States
