= Anne Panning =

American writer

Anne Panning is an American writer of both fiction and nonfiction. She teaches English at State University of New York at Brockport and co-directs the Brockport Writers Forum.

== Biography ==
Anne Panning grew up in Arlington, Minnesota and attended Augsburg College. She graduated in 1988 with a degree in English and then joined the Peace Corps. She served in the Philippines and then returned to the United States to study for her MFA in Creative Writing at Bowling Green State University in Ohio, where she graduated in 1993. She earned her PhD from University of Hawaii at Manoa in 1997.

Panning now teaches Creative Writing at State University of New York at Brockport and co-directs the Brockport Writers Forum with poet and colleague Ralph Black. She is married and has two children. Panning recently returned from living in Vietnam for six months while her husband taught on a Fulbright Fellowship and is working on a memoir about the experience, tentatively called Viet*Mom.

Her short stories and essays have appeared in The Florida Review, The Beloit Fiction Journal, New Letters, Prairie Schooner, The Bellingham Review, The Black Warrior Review, The South Dakota Review, Fine Print, Writing for Our Lives, Terminus, Passages North, The Alaska Quarterly Review, The Greensboro Review, The Writer Magazine, Quarterly West, Kalliope, Kenyon Review, Laurel Review, West Branch, Five Points, Under the Sun, and Cimarron Review.

== Awards ==
Panning has won various awards for her writing and teaching, including the Chancellor's Award for Teaching in 2006, and the 2007 Flannery O'Connor Award for Super America.

== Works ==
- The Price of Eggs, was published by Coffeehouse Press in 1992.
- Super America, was published in 2007 by University of Georgia Press.
- Butter was published in 2012 by Northern Illinois University Press.

== Reviews ==
Panning’s new collection radiates infectious optimism. Even when things aren’t going so well, her characters forge ahead, holding tight to their (mostly) modest goals: a nice house in a new subdivision, a reconciliation with an estranged wife, a new baby.
