= Ted Genoways =

American journalist and author (born 1972)

- Born: April 13, 1972 (age 54); Lubbock, Texas
- Occupations: Poet; journalist; editor
- Website: www.tedgenoways.com

Ted Genoways (born April 13, 1972) is an American journalist and author. He is a contributing writer at Mother Jones and The New Republic, and an editor-at-large at Pacific Standard. His books include This Blessed Earth and The Chain: Farm, Factory, and the Fate of Our Food.

He has been hailed by the Minneapolis Star-Tribune as a "marvelous poet" and by The Times Literary Supplement as a "tenacious scholar." He is the author of two books of poems and the literary history Walt Whitman and the Civil War, which, the Richmond Times-Dispatch wrote, "fills in a major gap in previous biographies of Whitman and rebuts the canard that Whitman was unaffected by the war and the run-up to it." His awards include fellowships from the National Endowment for the Arts, the Guggenheim Foundation, and inclusion in the Pushcart Prize Anthology and Best American Travel Writing. He was editor of the Virginia Quarterly Review from 2003 to 2012, during which time the magazine won six National Magazine Awards.

== Biography ==
Genoways was born in Lubbock, Texas, in 1972, and grew up in the North Hills of Pittsburgh, where "[m]ost boys' fathers... were mechanics, welders, steelworkers many of them Vietnam vets, laid off from the mills and scraping by. But my dad was Dr. Hugh H. Genoways, curator of mammals at the Carnegie Museum of Natural History." When Genoways' father was named director of the Nebraska State Museum, the family moved to Lincoln in 1986. As a freshman at Lincoln East High School, Genoways and others started a school magazine, Muse, which, two years later, the Columbia School of Journalism named the best high school publication in the country.

While completing a B.A. in English at Nebraska Wesleyan University in 1994, he worked at Prairie Schooner and founded the Coyote, a general-interest pop culture magazine, which also received multiple awards from the Columbia Scholastic Press Association. He worked at Texas Tech University Press while completing an M.A. in English from Texas Tech University. He worked at Callaloo and edited Meridian, which he founded, while completing his M.F.A. at the University of Virginia. He later worked at Coffee House Press and the Minnesota Historical Society Press, where he worked on Cheri Register's book Packinghouse Daughter, about the meatpackers strike in Albert Lea, Minnesota, in 1959.

Genoways' first book, a collection of poems entitled Bullroarer: A Sequence, was a narrative his grandfather "from his birth in a poor rural family to his work in the Omaha stockyards to his final years." Marilyn Hacker, who selected the book for the 2001 Samuel French Morse Poetry Prize, wrote in the book's introduction: "Perhaps it says something about the movement of American poetry that the stockyards and slaughterhouses choired in operatic open form by Carl Sandburg are rendered (a word that takes on another meaning in one poem) by Ted Genoways in a metered verse that spares the reader no detail. There is no romance to the blood and heat and animal terror communicated to workers (and readers) as it emanates from the killing floors of the Omaha meatpacking industry."

In 2003, while he was still a doctoral student at the University of Iowa and working at the Iowa Review, Genoways was hired by the University of Virginia to edit the Virginia Quarterly Review. He served as editor for the next nine years, during which time the magazine received six National Magazine Awards, two Utne Independent Press Awards, and an Overseas Press Club Award. In 2012, Genoways announced that he was stepping down as editor of VQR to pursue his writing career.

Genoways has since become a contributing writer at Mother Jones and The New Republic, as well as an editor-at-large at Pacific Standard. His essays and poetry have appeared in The Atlantic, Bloomberg Businessweek, Harper's, The New Republic, The New York Times Magazine, Outside, Poetry, and the Washington Post Book World. He has received a James Beard Foundation Award for Investigative Reporting, a MOTHER, and the James Aronson Award for Social Justice Journalism.

In October 2014, Genoways published the book The Chain: Farm, Factory, and the Fate of Our Food, which Eric Schlosser in the New York Times Book Review called an "important book, well worth reading, full of compelling stories, genuine outrage and the careful exposure of corporate lies."

In September 2017, Genoways published This Blessed Earth: A Year in the Life of an American Farm Family, which Arlo Crawford in the New York Times Book Review called "a cleareyed and unsentimental look at how farming has become relentlessly optimized by automation, markets and politics; factors that don’t always take into account the guy who’s actually driving the tractor." This Blessed Earth was the Nebraska Center for the Book's One Book One Nebraska selection, but Governor Pete Ricketts refused to sign the customary proclamation calling on citizens to read the book on the grounds that the This Blessed Earth, is written by a "political activist" and the story was "divisive."

According to Publishers Weekly, his next book Tequila Wars: José Cuervo and the Bloody Struggle for the Spirit of Mexico is scheduled to be edited by John Glusman at Norton. Tequila Wars aims to "tell the story of the modern tequila industry."

== Bibliography ==
=== Nonfiction ===
- Walt Whitman and the Civil War: America's Poet During the Lost Years of 1860-1862, University of California Press, 2009, ISBN 978-0-520-25906-5
- The Chain: Farm, Factory, and the Fate of Our Food, HarperCollins, 2014, ISBN 978-0062288776
- This Blessed Earth: A Year in the Life of an American Farm Family, W. W. Norton, 2017, ISBN 978-0-393-29257-2
- Tequila Wars: José Cuervo and the Bloody Struggle for the Spirit of Mexico, W.W. Norton, 2025, ISBN 978-0393292596

As editor

- A Perfect Picture of Hell: Eyewitness Accounts by Civil War Prisoners from the 12th Iowa (co-editor), University of Iowa Press, 2001, ISBN 978-0-87745-759-6
- Hard time: voices from a state prison, 1849-1914, Minnesota Historical Society Press, 2002, ISBN 978-0-87351-434-7
- Walt Whitman: The Correspondence, Volume VII, Iowa, 2004, ISBN 978-0877458913

=== Poetry ===
Collections

- Bullroarer: A Sequence, Northeastern University Press, 2001, ISBN 978-1-55553-507-0
- Anna, Washing, University of Georgia Press, 2008, ISBN 978-0-8203-3206-2

Limited edition collections

- The Dead Have a Way of Returning, Brooding Heron Press, 1997, ISBN 978-0-918116-92-5
- The Cow Caught in the Ice, Soundpost Press, University of Wisconsin–LaCrosse, 1999.
- Anna, washing, Parallel Press, University of Wisconsin–Madison, 2001, ISBN 1-893311-19-8

Edited volumes

- Burning the Hymnal: The Uncollected Poems of William Kloefkorn, Slow Tempo Press, 1994, ISBN 978-0963555939
- The Selected Poems of Miguel Hernández, University of Chicago Press, 2001, ISBN 978-0-22632-773-0
- Joseph Kalar, Papermill: Poems, 1927-1935, University of Illinois Press, 2006, ISBN 978-0252072000
- Swallowing the Soap: The Selected Poems of William Kloefkorn, University of Nebraska Press, 2010, ISBN 978-0803234055

== Awards ==
- 2024 James Beard Foundation Award, Food Coverage in a General Interest Publication
- 2023 Sidney Award from the Sidney Hillman Foundation for “How a Refugee’s American Dream Ended in a Police Killing”
- 2018 James Beard Foundation Award, Investigative Reporting
- 2018 Stubbendieck Great Plains Distinguished Book Prize for This Blessed Earth
- 2016 Association of Food Journalists Award, Best Writing on Beer, Wine or Spirits
- 2016 Association of Food Journalists Award, Best Food Business Story, Finalist
- 2016 James Beard Foundation Award for Food Reporting, Finalist
- 2015 James Beard Foundation Award for Writing and Literature, Finalist
- 2014 National Press Club Award
- 2014 James Aronson Award for Social Justice Journalism
- 2014 Association of Food Journalists Award, Best Story on Food Policy or Food Issues, Finalist
- 2010 Guggenheim Fellowship
- 2010 Choice / American Library Association Outstanding Academic Title for Walt Whitman and the Civil War
- 2003 National Endowment for the Arts fellowship in Poetry.
- 2002 Natalie Ornish Poetry Award for Bullroarer
- 2002 Nebraska Book Award for Poetry for Bullroarer
