= Brockport Writers Forum =

The Brockport Writers Forum is a series of readings and interviews founded in 1967 at the State University of New York College at Brockport by Gregory FitzGerald, then an associate professor in the English Department. FitzGerald, a poet and fiction writer himself, was the first faculty member to teach a creative writing course.

Subsequent directors of the forum include William Heyen, A. Poulin, Jr., Peter Marchant, Rodney Parshall, and Stan Rubin. The current co-directors are poet Ralph Black and fiction writer Anne Panning.

Over 200 authors have appeared at the forum since its inception, including June Jordan, Archibald MacLeish, Robert Bly, James Dickey, Galway Kinnell, John Berryman, W.S. Merwin, W.D. Snodgrass, Joyce Carol Oates, Howard Nemerov, Robert Creeley, Lawrence Ferlinghetti, Allen Ginsberg, James Wright, Richard Wilbur, Anne Waldman, Billy Collins. Nearly all of the readings have been recorded, and all of the interviews have been preserved on video, providing an invaluable educational resource.

The forum also conducted a summer writer's workshop for several years during the 1980s, and has also sponsored residencies, several symposia, and an annual Poetry Prize competition. It continues to offer the Art of Fact Award. A number of international authors have come to the forum, including Bosnian writer Asmir Kujovic, Russian poet Andrei Voznesensky, Moroccan fiction writer Leila Abouzeid, and South African novelist Nadine Gordimer.

The presence of the forum on the Brockport campus had a significant impact on the direction of the English Department at both the undergraduate and graduate level. A Master of Arts in English with a creative writing dissertation was introduced in 1971, attracting many students who went on to establish national and international reputations in writing. Those who studied creative writing at Brockport include poet Li-Young Lee, poet and editor Michael Waters, novelist and non-fiction writer James Howard Kunstler, poet and publisher Antonio Vallone, and poet, editor and publisher Frank Judge, who also served as associate director of the forum during FitzGerald's final tenure as director during the 1979–80 academic year.

== Sources ==
- The information in this entry is based on SUNY Brockport English Department brochures, program notes, college catalogues, the forum website, and other documents, as well as discussions with the former faculty members who served as directors of the Forum.
