= Chris Stedman =

American writer and activist

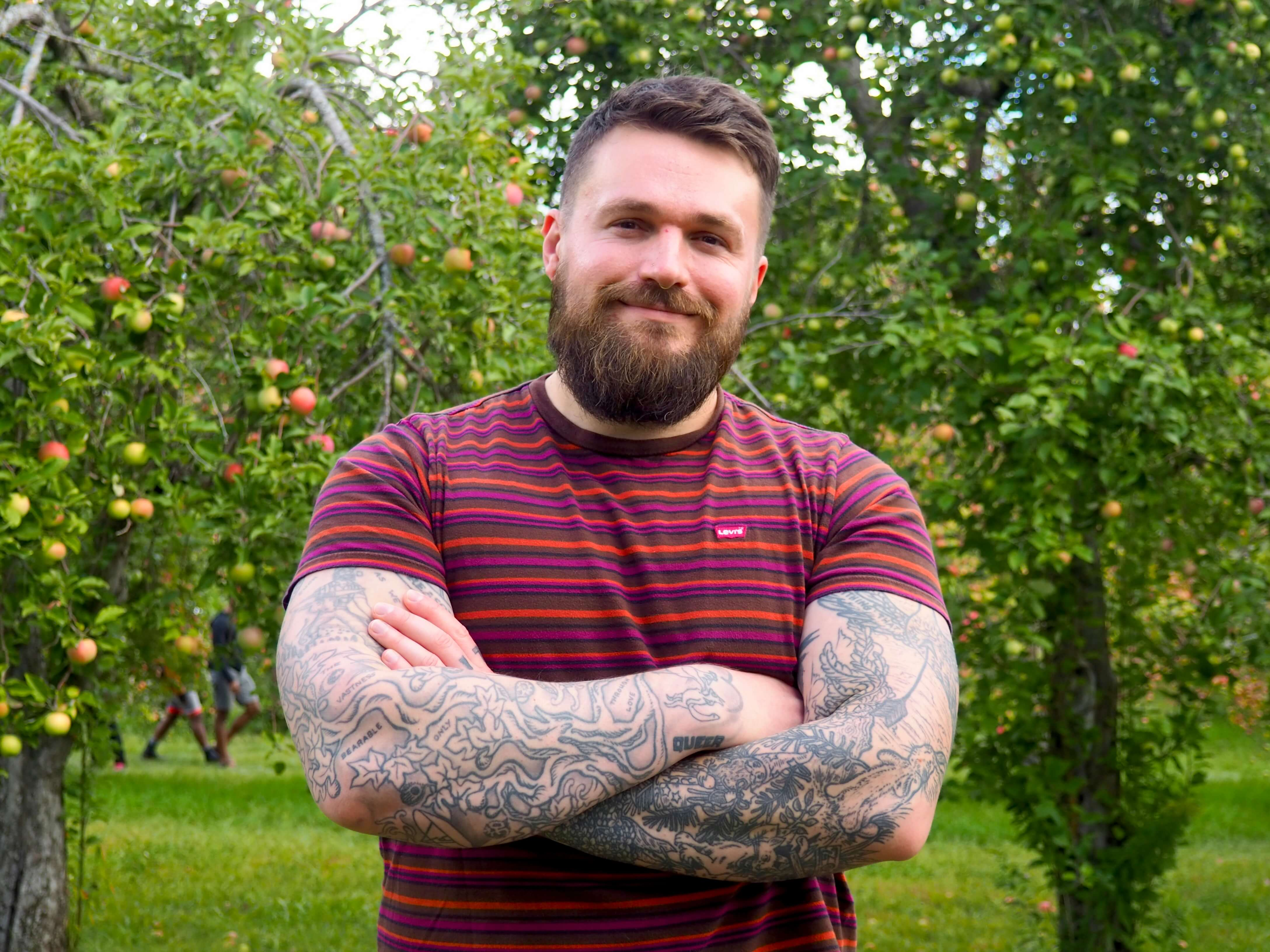
- Born: April 9, 1987 (age 39); Robbinsdale, Minnesota, U.S.
- Education: Augsburg University (BA); University of Chicago (MA)

Christopher Stedman (born April 9, 1987) is an American writer who teaches in the department of religion and philosophy at Augsburg University. He was previously the founding executive director of the Yale Humanist Community at Yale University and a humanist chaplain at Harvard University.

== Biography ==
Stedman was born in the Twin Cities area of Minnesota. He was raised in a secular household, but converted to Evangelical Christianity at the age of eleven, because he was attracted by its stability during his parents' divorce.

Stedman struggled for years to reconcile his gay sexual orientation with his Christian faith and declared himself an atheist in college. Stedman studied Religion at Augsburg University, Meadville Lombard Theological School at the University of Chicago, obtaining baccalaureate and master's degrees prior to joining Harvard at the Humanist Chaplaincy at Harvard. Following his time at Harvard, he founded the Yale Humanist Community.

Stedman currently teaches at Augsburg University.

He is the author of IRL and Faitheist, and host of the narrative podcast Unread, named one of the best podcasts of 2021 by the Guardian, Vulture, HuffPost, Bello Collective, Mashable, and the CBC. Stedman's writing advocates outreach to seek "common moral ground between theists and atheists," and proposes achieving that aim by expanding interfaith dialogue to include atheists.

== Awards ==
Stedman is a past awardee of the 2011 Billings Prize for Most Outstanding Scholastic Achievement.

In 2018, Augsburg University selected Stedman for the Decade Award, which recognizes alumni "who have made significant progress in their professional achievements and contributions to the community" in their first decade after graduating.

In 2022, Stedman was honored by the Webby Awards in the Podcasts - Best Writing category for his podcast Unread.

== Reception ==
Stedman's advocacy for inclusive interfaith dialogue and tolerance has found support from other atheists and interfaith advocates in the Millennial generation, as well as pluralistic rationalist communities.

Stedman has received some criticism for his open embrace of religion from the broader atheist community.
