= Alessandra Lynch =

American poet

Alessandra Lynch is an American poet and professor.

== Career ==
She is the author of four collections of poetry, most recently Pretty Tripwire. Her third, Daylily Called It a Dangerous Moment, won the Balcones Poetry Prize, and was a finalist for the Los Angeles Times Book Prize, and UNT Rilke Poetry Prize, and was named one of the ten best books of poetry in 2017 by The New York Times. Her second, It was a terrible cloud at twilight, won the Lena-Miles Wever Todd Prize.

Her work has appeared in the American Poetry Review, The Antioch Review, Colorado Review, The Cortland Review, The Massachusetts Review, Ploughshares, and other literary publications. Her books have been reviewed in The New York Times, Publishers Weekly, Library Journal, Ploughshares, The Cincinnati Review, and other venues. She has been interviewed by The Indianapolis Review and Southeast Review.

She has received fellowships from MacDowell, Yaddo, and the Vermont Studio Center, as well as a Creative Renewal Fellowship for the Arts from the Indianapolis Council for the Arts, and a Barbara Deming Award. She is the current Poet-in-Residence at Butler University, and teaches in their undergraduate and MFA programs.

== Personal life ==
Alessandra Lynch is married to the poet Chris Forhan, and they live in Indianapolis with their sons.

== Published works ==
- Pretty Tripwire (Alice James Books, 2021)
- Daylily Called It a Dangerous Moment (Alice James Books, 2017)
- It was a terrible cloud at twilight (Pleaides Press/LSU Press, 2008)
- Sails the Wind Left Behind (Alice James Books, 2002)

== Sources ==
- "The Official Website of Alessandra Lynch". Alessandra Lynch's Web Site. 2017-12-22.
- "Pretty Tripwire". Alice James Books.
