= Morse Poetry Prize =

American literary award

The Samuel French Morse Poetry Prize, in honor of Samuel French Morse, is a literary award given to an American author's first or second book of poetry.

The annual prize was established in 1983 and sponsored by Northeastern University. Once selected by a recognized poet, the awarded poet received $1000, and the work received publication by Northeastern University Press, and distribution through the University Press of New England. Prize-winning books were published with a striped cover design, characteristic of the Morse Poetry Prize.

The award was suspended in 2009, due to difficulties with financial sustainability.

== Winners ==
- 2009: Lisa Gluskin Stonestreet, Tulips, Water, Ash, Judge: Jean Valentine
- 2008: Dana Roeser, In the Truth Room
- 2007: Virginia Chase Sutton, What Brings You to Del Amo
- 2005: Roy Jacobstein, A Form of Optimism
- 2004: Annie Boutelle, Nest of Thistles
- 2003: Dana Roeser, Beautiful Motion: Poems
- 2002: Chris Forhan, The Actual Moon, the Actual Stars
- 2001: Catherine Sasanov, All the Blood Tethers
- 2000: Ted Genoways, Bullroarer: A Sequence
- 1999: Jennifer Atkinson, The Drowned City
- 1998: James Haug, Walking Liberty
- 1997: Jeffrey Greene, American Spirituals
- 1996: Charles Harper Webb, Reading the Water
- 1995: Michelle Boisseau, Understory
- 1994: Allison Funk, Living at the Epicenter
- 1993: David Moolten, Plums and Ashes
- 1992: Don Boes, The Eighth Continent
- 1991: Carl Phillips, In the Blood
- 1990: George Mills, The House Sails Out of Sight of Home
- 1989: J. Allyn Rosser, Bright Moves
- 1988: Lucia Perillo, Dangerous Life
- 1987: Frank Gaspar, The Holyoke
- 1986: Sue Ellen Thompson, This Body of Silk
- 1985: William Carpenter, Rain
- 1984: Susan Donnelly, Eve Names the Animals, Judge: Anthony Hecht

== See also ==
- American poetry
- List of poetry awards
- List of literary awards
- List of years in poetry
- List of years in literature
