= Patricia Janus =

American poet, artist, and educator

Patricia "Pat" Janus (April 20, 1932 – June 9, 2006) was an American poet, artist, and educator.

== Biography ==
Born Patricia O'Brien to Thomas and Rose O'Brien, she was raised in New York City where she worked for a brokerage firm. She met John "Jack" Janus (1910-1991), whom she married in the early 1950s. Her husband went on to become a pharmacist, and his work eventually transplanted the family (which by then included two sons and one on the way) to Rochester, NY.

Her work appeared in numerous literary publications, including The Atlantic Monthly, Yankee, The National Catholic Reporter and American Poetry Review, and was anthologized in several volumes, including Summer Songs (2004), Knocking on the Silence (2005), and The Pinnacle Hill Review. Her collectionm Love in the Time of Anthrax, was released by FootHills Publishing in 2005. Her last volume is Synchronicity, published by FootHills in June, 2006.

She was a member of Rochester Poets since the late 1960s (when it was called The Rochester Poetry Society) and served the organization in several posts, including more than one term as president.

She was also a member of a group of Rochester artists who meet weekly as the Artists' Breakfast Group in the cafeteria of the Bausch & Lomb headquarters in Rochester. She created a number of mixed media pieces over the years which were displayed in various area exhibits, including Rochester's Center at High Falls Gallery, "Line Art", and the "16x20" and, in May 2006, "Text & Texture II", which featured what would be her final piece, "Pain."

She had a career as a hospital nurse; upon her retirement she worked in Rochester as a chaplain at Highland Hospital, and an oncology nurse at the Rochester hospice, Isaiah House.

Battling cancer herself for nearly a year, she died on Friday, June 9, 2006, at age 74, at Highland Hospital. The night before, she had given a reading to a full house at Barnes & Noble in Pittsford, NY for Synchronicity, a collection of poems spanning the years since 1970. The book had just been released that day.

She continued her work as a chaplain and nurse up until a few weeks before her death and was still working on a chapbook of poems about New Mexico.
