= Frank X. Gaspar =

American poet

- Born: Frank Xavier Gaspar; Provincetown, Massachusetts, U.S.
- Education: University of California, Irvine (MFA)
- Occupations: Poet; novelist; professor
- Writing career
- Notable awards: Morse Poetry Prize (1988); Brittingham Prize in Poetry (1999); Pushcart Prize (x3)

Frank Xavier Gaspar is an American poet, novelist and professor of Portuguese descent. A number of his books treat Portuguese-American themes or settings, particularly the Portuguese community in Provincetown, Massachusetts. His most recent novel is The Poems of Renata Ferreira (Tagus Press (January 16, 2020)). His most recent collection of poems is Poem Fire: New and Selected (Autumn House Press, 2026). His fourth collection of poetry, Night of a Thousand Blossoms (Alice James Books, 2004) was one of 12 books honored as the "Best Poetry of 2004" by Library Journal. Gaspar's books have won many awards. His first collection of poetry, The Holyoke, won the 1988 Morse Poetry Prize (selected by Mary Oliver); Mass for the Grace of a Happy Death won the 1994 Anhinga Prize for Poetry (selected by Joy Harjo); A Field Guide to the Heavens won the 1999 Brittingham Prize in Poetry (selected by Robert Bly; his novel, Leaving Pico, won the California Book Award For First Fiction, and the Barnes & Noble Discovery Award., and Stealing Fatima was a Massbook of the year in fiction (Massachusetts Center for the Book). He has published poems in numerous journals and magazines, including The Nation, Harvard Review, The American Poetry Review, Kenyon Review The Hudson Review, The Georgia Review, Ploughshares, Prairie Schooner, Mid-American Review, and Gettysburg Review. His poetry has been anthologized in Best American Poetry 1996 and 2000. He has won fellowships from the National Endowment for the Arts and The California Arts Commission, and received three Pushcart Prizes.

Born in Provincetown, Massachusetts, in 1966 Gaspar joined the U.S. Navy and served for 3 1/2 years, including two tours on the aircraft carrier USS Hornet (CV-12) during the Vietnam War and the recovery of Apollo 11 space module. He earned a Master of Fine Arts (MFA) from the University of California, Irvine.

During fall semester of 2010, he taught in the Department of English at the University of Massachusetts Dartmouth as the Endowed Chair Professor in Portuguese Studies. He has been professor of English and creative writing at Long Beach City College in Long Beach, California, and has taught in the Graduate Writing Program at Antioch University Los Angeles. Currently, he teaches in the MFA Writing Program at Pacific University, Oregon.

== Published works ==
Poetry Collections

- Poem Fire: New and Selected (Autumn House Press, 2026)
- Late Rapturous (Autumn House Press, July 1, 2012)
- Night of a Thousand Blossoms (Farmington: Alice James Books, 2004)
- A Field Guide to the Heavens (Madison: University of Wisconsin Press, 1999)
- Mass for the Grace of a Happy Death (Tallahassee: Anhinga Press, 1995)
- The Holyoke (Boston: Northeastern University Press, 1988)

Novels

- The Poems of Renata Ferreira (Tagus Press, January, 2020)
- Stealing Fatima (Counterpoint, December, 2009) (see Counterpoint LLC)
- Leaving Pico (Hanover: University Press of New England, 1999)

== Sources ==
Contemporary Authors Online. The Gale Group, 2002. PEN (Permanent Entry Number): 0000138095
