= Michelle Boisseau =

American poet (1955–2017)

- Born: October 26, 1955; Cincinnati, Ohio, United States
- Died: November 15, 2017 (aged 62)
- Education: Ohio University; University of Houston
- Writing career
- Notable awards: Samuel French Morse Poetry Prize; Guggenheim Fellowship

Michelle Boisseau (October 26, 1955 – November 15, 2017) was an American poet.

== Life and career ==
Boisseau was born in Cincinnati, Ohio on October 26, 1955. She attended Ohio University, where she received a BA in 1977 and an MA in 1980, and the University of Houston where she received her PhD in 1985. She began teaching at the University of Missouri-Kansas City in 1995.

She published her first collection of poetry, No Private Life in 1990. This was followed by Understory in 1996 which won the Samuel French Morse Poetry Prize. She published Trembling Airs in 2003, A Sunday in God-Years in 2009 and Among the Gorgons in 2016. She has also published a textbook called Writing Poems and her work also appeared in publications such as Poetry, The Yale Review and The Cincinnati Review.

She was awarded with a Guggenheim Fellowship in 2017 for her work.

She died on November 15, 2017, from lung cancer.

== Bibliography ==
- Among the Gorgons (2016) ISBN 1597321362
- A Sunday in God-Years (2009) ISBN 1557289018
- Tremblimg Air (2003) ISBN 155728752X
- Understory (1996) ISBN 1555532861
- No Private Life (1990) ISBN 0826512399
