= Micah Nathan =

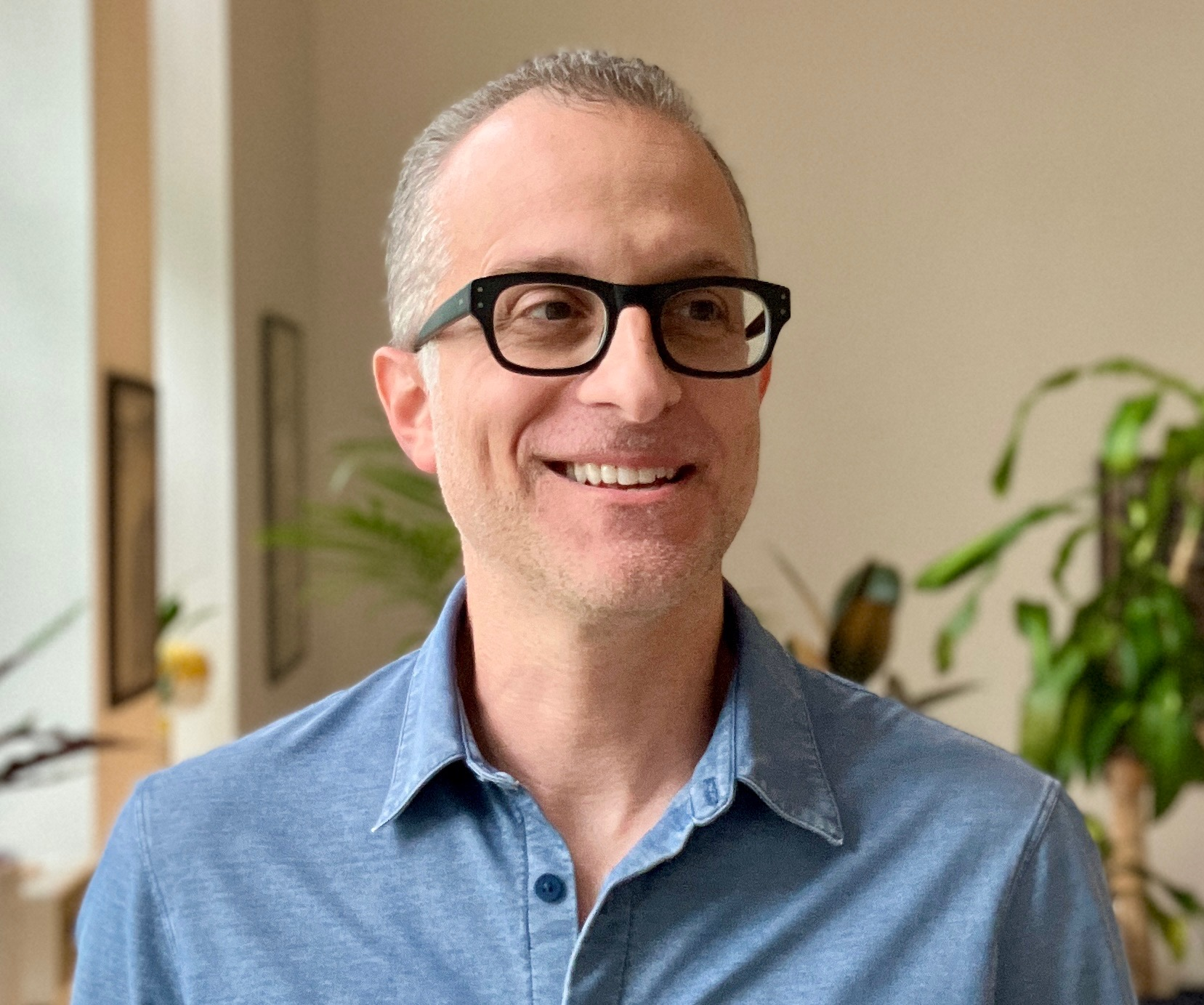
- Nathan in 2024
- Born: Los Angeles, California, U.S.
- Education: University at Buffalo (BA); Boston University (MFA)
- Occupations: Novelist; short-story writer; essayist
- Writing career
- Period: 2005–present
- Notable works: Gods of Aberdeen (2005); Losing Graceland (2011); Jack the Bastard and Other Stories (2012)
- Website: micahnathan.com

Micah Nathan is an American novelist, short-story writer, essayist, and lecturer at the Massachusetts Institute of Technology (MIT). He is the author of the novels Gods of Aberdeen (Simon & Schuster, 2005) and Losing Graceland (Broadway Books, 2011), and the short-story collection Jack the Bastard and Other Stories (One Peace Books, 2012). His fiction and nonfiction have appeared in Vanity Fair, The Paris Review, and The Guardian.

== Career ==
Nathan's first novel, Gods of Aberdeen, was published by Simon & Schuster in 2005. The novel received reviews in The Hollywood Reporter, Kirkus Reviews, Library Journal, and Publishers Weekly, among other outlets. His second novel, Losing Graceland, was published by Broadway Books in 2011. The novel follows a recent college graduate who is hired to drive an elderly man claiming to be Elvis Presley to Memphis, Tennessee. Reviews appeared in The Washington Post, The Boston Globe, Booklist, Library Journal, among others.

In 2012, One Peace Books published Nathan's first short-story collection, Jack the Bastard and Other Stories. The collection includes illustrations by comic-book artists Phil Noto, Michael Allred, Russ Nicholson, and Tradd Moore.

Nathan's fiction and essays have appeared in Vanity Fair, The Paris Review, The Guardian, Kinfolk, Little White Lies, Boston Globe Magazine, Glimmer Train, The Gettysburg Review, Bellingham Review, Commonweal, and Free Inquiry. His short story "Quarry", originally published in Glimmer Train, was selected for The Best American Mystery Stories 2013, edited by Lisa Scottoline and Otto Penzler. In 2019, his story "Get Him" appeared in From Sea to Stormy Sea: 17 Stories Inspired by Great American Paintings, an anthology edited by crime novelist Lawrence Block and published by Pegasus Books.

Nathan was head copy editor and fiction editor of Lemon: King of Pop, which received a 2013 D&AD Wood Pencil in Magazine & Newspaper Design. In 2021, Nathan co-founded the video-game company Consortium9 and served as its chief narrative officer. Boston University's alumni magazine reported that he helped the company raise more than $10 million in seed funding.

Nathan received an MFA in creative writing from Boston University, where he received the 2010 Saul Bellow Prize for Fiction. His essay "All in the Family", published in Commonweal, received an Associated Press short-essay award. Nathan is a lecturer in MIT's Comparative Media Studies program.
