= Jenna Blum =

American writer

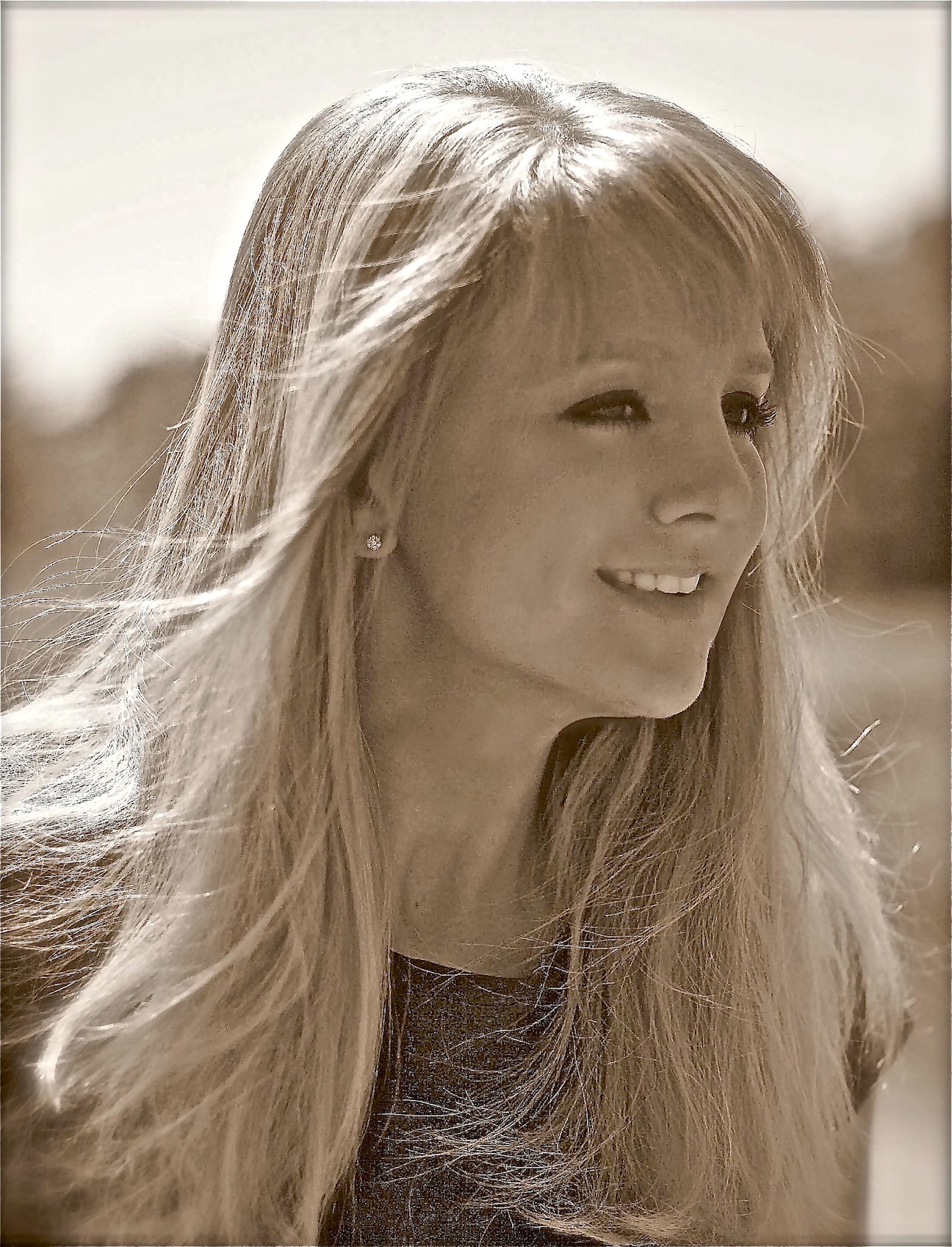
- Born: Jenna Blum; 1970 (age 55–56); U.S.
- Education: Kenyon College; Boston University
- Occupations: Author, educator
- Writing career
- Genre: fiction writing
- Website: jennablum.com

Jenna Blum (born c. 1970) is an American writer who has written four novels, Those Who Save Us, The Stormchasers, The Lost Family and Murder Your Darlings. In 2013, she was selected by the Modern Scholar series to teach an audio lecture course entitled The Author at Work: The Art of Writing Fiction. Blum leads novelists as part of the Grub Street writing center, a Boston-based workshop for writers.

== Biography ==
Blum grew up with a Jewish father and part-German mother in the United States. She lived in Minnesota for four years. She taught creative writing and communications writing at Boston University and also taught fiction and novel workshops for Grub Street Writers in Boston since 1997. Her first novel Those Who Save Us was published in hardcover by Harcourt in 2004 and in paperback in 2005 and explored how non-Jewish Germans dealt with the Holocaust; according to one account, it shows the “grace and brutality of human interaction in desperate times,” and was described as having “wonderful prose” with “strongly developed characters.” It was a New York Times best-seller as well as the bestselling book in the Netherlands for one year.
