= William Heyen =

American journalist

William Hayen
- Born: 1940 (age 85–86); Brooklyn, New York, U.S.
- Education: The College at Brockport, SUNY; Ohio University
- Occupations: Poet, writer

William Helmuth Heyen (born November 1, 1940) is an American poet, editor, and literary critic. He was born in Brooklyn, New York and grew up in Suffolk County. He received a B.A. degree from the State University of New York at Brockport and earned a doctorate in English from Ohio University in Athens, Ohio in 1967.

== Career ==
He taught American literature and creative writing at SUNY–Brockport for over 30 years before retiring in 2000. He briefly served as the director of the Brockport Writers Forum, a series of readings by and video interviews with numerous American and international authors. His work has been published in numerous literary journals and periodicals including The New Yorker, The Ontario Review, Harper's, TriQuarterly, The Georgia Review, Poetry, American Poetry Review, The Southern Review and online publications like Exit-Online. His work has also been published in 200 anthologies, in dozens of limited-edition chapbooks and broadsides, and in audio recordings.

He spent the 1971–1972 academic year as a Senior Fulbright Lecturer in American literature at the Leibniz University Hannover, West Germany. During this time, he visited a number of Holocaust sites. The experiences combined with his own family history (including an uncle who was in the German army), resulted in three volumes of poetry on the subject published over the next 32 years. He has been awarded NEA, Guggenheim, American Academy & Institute of Arts & Letters, and other prizes.

Prior to the publication of his first collection, a privately printed ephemeral edition of the poem "The Mower," including several drafts, was printed in softcover. The final version of "The Mower" appeared in his first collection, Depth of Field (1970). Other collections are Noise in the Trees (1974), The Swastika Poems (1977), Long Island Light (1979), Erika: Poems of the Holocaust (1984), Pterodactyl Rose (1991), Crazy Horse In Stillness (1996), Pig Notes & Dumb Music: Prose on Poetry (1998), Diana, Charles, & the Queen (1998), Shoah Train (2003), which was a finalist for the National Book Award for Poetry in 2004, The Angel Voices (Mayapple Press, 2010), and most recently Straight’s Suite for Craig Cotter & Frank O’Hara (Mayapple Press, 2012). He also wrote a novel, Vic Holyfield and the Class of ’57 (1986). Selections of his poems have been translated into Italian (by poet Frank Judge), into Swedish (by Stewe Claeson) and into German.

He edited two major collections of poetry, The Generation of 2000: Contemporary American Poets, and American Poets in 1976. He is also the editor of September 11, 2001: American Poets Respond (2002). Many of his manuscripts, correspondence, and his collection of first editions of modern American authors are archived in the Rare Books Collection at the University of Rochester in Rochester, New York; at Boston University, at the Beinecke Library at Yale University, and at the University of New Hampshire in Durham.

In 2004, he was one of the five finalists for the National Book Award for poetry for his volume Shoah Train. Other volumes of the past few years are September 11, 2001: American Writers Respond (2002) a collection of short stories, The Hummingbird Corporation (2003), and a collection of 30 years of essays called Home: Autobiographies, etc. His most recent collections are Confessions of Doc Williams and Other Poems (2006) and Titanic & Iceberg: Early Essays and Reviews (2006).
