= Anthony Piccione =

American writer

Anthony Piccione (July 3, 1939 – November 18, 2001) was an American poet. Born in Sheffield, Alabama, and raised on Long Island.

He is author of four collections of poetry published by BOA Editions, Ltd., the Rochester, NY publishing house founded by his colleague and friend, A. Poulin, Jr.

His first book, Anchor Dragging, was chosen by Archibald MacLeish for BOA's New Poets of America series. His poetry also appeared in numerous literary publications including American Poetry Review, Ohio Review, The Literary Review, Coffee House, and Web del Sol.

He earned a doctorate in English from Ohio University in 1969 (his thesis was on the poetry and poetics of Robert Bly) and taught English language and literature and creative writing at the State University of New York College at Brockport from 1970 until his retirement in 1995.

His awards included grants from the Constance Saltonstall Foundation and the State University of New York.

In 2000, he founded Upright Hall, a residence retreat for poets on his farm in the hills near Prattsburgh, New York. He was one of the first poets to support the Poets For Peace readings organized by poet Larry Jaffe and others. He also served as an unofficial poetry advisor for In Posse Review.

Piccione died after a brief battle with cancer on November 18, 2001. His ashes were buried in a plot close to the farm, where his daughters grew up, in Kendall, NY.

== Bibliography ==
- Anchor Dragging (1977) ISBN 0-918526-11-6
- Seeing It Was So (1986) ISBN 0-918526-50-7
- For the Kingdom (1995) ISBN 1-880238-23-3
- Guests at the Gate (2002) ISBN 1-929918-26-7
