= Elphin, Tasmania =

Unofficial urban locality in Tasmania

Elphin
- Coordinates: 41.4309631°S 147.1548845°E
- Country: Australia
- State: Tasmania

Elphin is an unofficial urban locality, located in Newstead, near the City of Launceston in Tasmania, Australia.

It has no population census since it is not a gazetted locality or an actual settlement since it is a part of Newstead.

== Road infrastructure ==
Route A3 (Elphin Road) runs through from north to south.

== Facilities ==
- Elphin Sports Centre
- Newstead Tennis & Squash Centre
