= Super America =

First edition (publ. University of Georgia Press)

Super America is the 2007 Flannery O'Connor Award winning short story collection by Anne Panning.

The collection includes ten short stories. The stories are in a range of different settings in the United States and abroad. Panning had submitted works to the Flannery O'Conner Award for many years prior, and had twice been a finalist, before Super America won the award. In the collection, only a few of the stories had been previously published.

The Publishers Weekly review of the book said that the "warmth and originality of these pieces demonstrate Panning to be an astute and empathetic observer." The New York Times described the collection as "radiat[ing] infectious optimism".
