= Writers & Books =

Nonprofit literary arts center in Rochester, New York

- Founded: 1981
- Founder: Joe Flaherty
- Type: 501(c)(3) nonprofit
- Tax ID no.: 16-1154656
- Purpose: Creative writing, literary arts, literary education
- Location: 740 University Avenue, Rochester, New York, United States
- Coordinates: 43.1568°N 77.6058°W
- Key people: Michael Solis (executive director)
- Website: wab.org

Writers & Books is a nonprofit literary arts center located at 740 University Avenue in Rochester, New York, United States. Founded in 1981, the organization offers more than 300 creative writing workshops and classes annually, operates a youth writing program, hosts visiting author events, publishes books through its in-house press, and runs an independent bookstore. The organization also operates the Gell: A Finger Lakes Creative Retreat, a 24-acre writers' retreat in the Bristol Hills near Naples.

Writers & Books engages approximately 25,000 to 30,000 people annually, including 5,000 children, through its programs and outreach activities in schools, hospitals, libraries, senior centers, and recreation centers. In 1986, the New York State Council on the Arts (NYSCA) designated Writers & Books a "Primary Arts Organization," making it the only literary center in New York to receive the distinction.

== History ==
=== The Book Bus ===
In 1974, Joe Flaherty (c. 1946 -- September 15, 2024) founded The Book Bus, a mobile bookstore that traveled throughout the northeastern United States distributing small-press books. The project was backed by Aperture, a nonprofit publisher, and funded by grants from the National Endowment for the Arts (NEA) and the New York State Council on the Arts (NYSCA). By 1980, rising fuel costs made the mobile operation unsustainable, and Flaherty transitioned the project into a stationary literary center at 892 South Clinton Avenue in Rochester.

=== Incorporation and early growth ===
Writers & Books was incorporated as a 501(c)(3) nonprofit organization in 1981. In January 1985, the organization moved to its current location at 740 University Avenue, a former police precinct station designed by architect Claude Fayette Bragdon. That same year, the organization launched SummerWrite, its flagship youth creative writing program.

In August 1986, the New York State Council on the Arts named Writers & Books a "Primary Arts Organization," a designation that at the time made it the only literary center in the state to receive this recognition.

=== Gell Center and expansion ===
In 1988, Dr. Kenneth Gell and his wife Geraldine bequeathed their 24-acre property in the Bristol Hills near Naples to Writers & Books. The organization received full title to the property in 1991. In 1992, Gleason Lodge was constructed on the grounds with funding from the Gleason Memorial Fund, and the property was renamed the Gell Writers Center of the Finger Lakes.

In 2000, Writers & Books purchased the 740 University Avenue building from the City of Rochester. Renovations were completed the following year, doubling workshop space and adding an accessible community room, a glass-enclosed atrium, and an elevator. Also in 2001, the organization inaugurated Rochester Reads, an annual citywide one-book reading program, with Ernest J. Gaines's novel A Lesson Before Dying as its first selection.

In 2017, Writers & Books received a $527,000 grant from NYSCA and Empire State Development for expansion of the Gell Center. In 2019, the organization established Ampersand Books, an independent bookstore at its University Avenue location. Renovation of the Gell retreat was completed in 2024.

=== Founder's death ===
Joe Flaherty, who had retired as executive director in 2016 after 35 years leading the organization, died on September 15, 2024. Writers & Books established the Joe Flaherty Memorial Fund in his honor.

== Programs ==
=== Workshops and classes ===
Writers & Books offers more than 300 creative writing workshops and classes each year in genres including fiction, poetry, screenwriting, and creative nonfiction. Classes are held at the University Avenue center and are open to writers of all levels.

=== SummerWrite ===
SummerWrite, established in 1985, is the organization's flagship youth program. The nine-week summer program serves approximately 200 campers ages 7 to 16, with class sizes limited to 12 students. Individual scholarships are available, and the organization operates tuition-free camps at five Rochester Public Library branches.

=== Rochester Reads ===
Rochester Reads is an annual citywide one-book reading program inaugurated in 2001. The program selects a single book for community-wide reading and discussion each year. The first selection was Ernest J. Gaines's A Lesson Before Dying.

=== Other programs ===
Additional programs include the Visiting Authors Series, the Annual Regional Playwriting Competition (presented in partnership with Geva Theatre Center), the 2 Pages/2 Voices and Plays in a Day theater programs, The Ladder Literary Conference, and Big Pencil Press, the organization's in-house publishing imprint. Writers & Books also conducts outreach programming in schools, hospitals, libraries, senior centers, and recreation centers throughout the Rochester area.

== Building ==
The Writers & Books center is housed in a former police precinct station at 740 University Avenue in Rochester's Neighborhood of the Arts cultural district. The building was designed by architect Claude Fayette Bragdon (1866--1946), who designed five police precinct stations with partner J. Con Hillman between approximately 1896 and 1904. Writers & Books moved into the building in January 1985 and purchased it from the City of Rochester in 2000. Major renovations completed in 2001 doubled the organization's workshop space and added a glass-enclosed atrium with an elevator and an accessible community room.

== Gell: A Finger Lakes Creative Retreat ==
Gell: A Finger Lakes Creative Retreat is a 24-acre writers' retreat operated by Writers & Books in the Bristol Hills near Naples, New York, at 6581 West Hollow Road. The property was originally the private residence of Dr. Kenneth Gell, who developed it beginning in 1929 and named it "The Beagle." Dr. Gell and his wife Geraldine bequeathed the property to Writers & Books in 1988; the organization received full title in 1991.

Facilities on the property include Gell House, which contains two writers' suites; Gleason Lodge, constructed in 1992 with funding from the Gleason Memorial Fund; Thoreau Cabin; and the Tree House. The retreat operates seasonally, offering writing residencies, workshops, and retreats with stays ranging from two days to one month.

== Leadership ==
Joe Flaherty founded Writers & Books and served as its executive director from the organization's incorporation in 1981 until his retirement in 2016. He also served as interim director from October 2018 to May 2019. Kyle Semmel succeeded Flaherty as executive director in 2016 and served until October 2018.

Alison Meyers, previously executive director of the Cave Canem Foundation, was named executive director in May 2019 and served until September 2025. Michael Solis, a Princeton University graduate, Henry Luce Scholar, and debut novelist, became executive director in September 2025.

== Notable visitors ==
Writers & Books has hosted numerous notable authors, including Allen Ginsberg, who visited three times, as well as Ann Patchett, Octavia Butler, Terry McMillan, N. K. Jemisin, and Omar El Akkad.

== Recognition ==
In 1986, the New York State Council on the Arts designated Writers & Books a "Primary Arts Organization," making it the only literary center in New York to hold the distinction. In 2024, the organization received a LitNYS Advancement Regrant Award.

== See also ==
- Rochester, New York
- Claude Fayette Bragdon
- Cave Canem Foundation
- Neighborhood of the Arts
