= Bellingham Review =

American literary magazine

- Editor: Jane Wong
- Categories: Literary magazine
- Frequency: Biannual
- Publisher: Western Washington University
- First issue: 1977
- Country: United States
- Based in: Bellingham, Washington
- Language: English
- Website: www.bhreview.org
- ISSN: 0734-2934

The Bellingham Review is an American literary magazine published by Western Washington University. The magazine was established in 1977 by the poets Knute Skinner and Peter Nicoletta. The Bellingham Review includes fiction, poetry, and creative non-fiction. The current editor is writer Jane Wong. Work that has appeared in the Bellingham Review has been reprinted in The Pushcart Prize Anthology and The Best American Poetry. Notable contributors include: Micah Nathan, Jenna Blum, Anne Panning, Sheila Bender, and Deborah A. Miranda.

== Awards ==
The magazine yearly awards "The Annie Dillard Award for Creative Nonfiction" and "The Tobias Wolff Award for Fiction". The awards were established by novelist Robin Hemley, a former Bellingham Review editor.

Recent winners (nonfiction)

- 2002 - Ander Monson
- 2006 - Madeline Sonik
- 2009 - Alexandria Marzano-Lesnevich
- 2015 - Leigh Claire Schmidli

Recent winners (fiction)

- 2006 - Mark Wisniewski
- 2007 - Natalie Diaz
- 2010 - Jacob M. Appel
- 2015 - Eric Roe

== See also ==
- List of literary magazines
