= Di Costanzo =

Di Costanzo is an Italian surname. Notable people with the surname include:

- Angelo di Costanzo (c. 1507 – 1591), Italian historian and poet
- Greg "Storm" DiCostanzo, a member of the duo Paul and Storm
- Luigi Di Costanzo (born 1982), Italian water polo player
- Marco Di Costanzo (born 1992), Italian rower
- Mario Alberto di Costanzo Armenta (born 1962), Mexican economist and politician from the Labor Party
- Cuono "Nello" Di Costanzo (born 1961), Italian football manager and former player
- Richard A. DiCostanzo (1908–?), New York state senator 1943–1946

== See also ==
- Costanzo
