= Costanza =

Costanza is a feminine given name. It may refer to:

== People ==
=== Given name ===
- Costanza d'Avalos, Duchess of Francavilla (1460–1541)
- Costanza Bonaccorsi (born 1994), Italian canoeist
- Costanza Casati (born 1995), Italian writer
- Costanza Chiaramonte (1377–1423), Neapolitan noble
- Costanza Di Camillo (born 1995), Italian synchronized swimmer
- Costanza Farnese (1500–1545), daughter of Pope Paul III
- Costanza Fiorentini (born 1984), Italian synchronized swimmer
- Costanza Ferro (born 1993), Italian synchronized swimmer
- Costanza Ghilini (1754–1775), Italian painter
- Costanza Sforza, Duchess of Sora (1550–1617)
- Costanza Starace (1845–1921), Italian nun
- Costanza Varano (1426–1447), Italian humanist
- Costanza Zanoletti (born 1980), Italian skeleton racer

== See also ==
- Constance (name)
- Costanza (disambiguation)
- Costanza (surname)
