= Ghilini =

Ghilini is a surname. Notable people with the surname include:

- Costanza Ghilini (1754–1775), Italian painter
- Ghilino Ghilini (died 1559), Roman Catholic prelate
- Girolamo Ghilini (1589–1668), Italian writer and scholar
