= Life on Earth (poetry collection) =

2024 poetry collection by Dorianne Laux

- Author: Dorianne Laux
- Publisher: W. W. Norton & Company
- Publication date: January 9, 2024
- Pages: 112
- ISBN: 978-1324065821
- Preceded by: Only As the Day Is Long

Life on Earth: Poems is a 2024 poetry collection by Dorianne Laux, published by W. W. Norton & Company. Laux's seventh collection, it was longlisted for the 2024 National Book Award for Poetry.

== Contents ==
The book tackles themes such as family, aging, and grief, among others. It also addresses banality and the natural world. In an interview with Saint Mary's College of California, Laux stated much of the book was written during the COVID-19 pandemic.

The book's poem of the same name was published in The Atlantic and chosen by Major Jackson for an episode of The Slowdown.

== Critical reception ==
In a starred review, Publishers Weekly lauded the book "spellbinding" and said "Laux makes the quotidian feel monumental in a way that is uniquely her own."

The New Yorker, in a briefly noted review, said "Laux’s deft, muscular verse illuminates the sharp facets of everyday existence, rendering humble things ... into opportunities to project memory and imagination. Beautifully constructed exercises in tender yet fierce attention, these poems bear witness to deaths in the family, to climate destruction, and to the ravages of U.S. history, even as they insist on intimacy and wonder." On the Seawall said "Laux’s lenses, however, see into yet unperceived life within our subtle relationships with products, inventions, and pop culture, as well as the flexible boundaries we share with myth, poetry, and the unwitnessed, unexperienced aspects of our own lives and souls." On The Slowdown, Jackson stated the poem "Life on Earth" "says from the day of our first breath, we humans matter."
