= Costanza (surname) =

Costanza is an Italian surname. Notable people with this name include the following:

- Chrissy Costanza (born 1995), American singer
- John Costanza (born 1943), American artist and letterer
- Midge Costanza (1932–2010), American politician
- Mike Costanza, American filmmaker
- Pascal Costanza, German computer scientist
- Pete Costanza (1913–1984), American comic book artist and illustrator
- Robert Costanza (born 1950), American-Australian ecologist and economist
- Tomas Costanza (born 1976), American record producer
- Tony Costanza (1968–2020), American drummer
- Valentina Costanza (born 1987), Italian runner
- George Costanza, fictional character from Seinfeld

== See also ==
- Costanza
- Costanza (disambiguation)
- Costanzo (surname)
