= Constanzo =

Constanzo is an Italian given name or surname. Notable people with the name include:

== Given name ==
- Constanzo Beschi (1680–1747), Italian jesuit priest, missionary, and Tamil language littérateur
- Constanzo Festa (c. 1485/1490–1545), Italian composer
- Constanzo Mangini (1918–1981), Italian ice hockey player

== Surname ==
- Adolfo Constanzo (1962–1989), American serial killer, drug trafficker, and cult leader
- Carmine Constanzo (died 1997), actor and father of Robert Costanzo
- Steve Constanzo (born 1988), Australian basketball player
- Ted Constanzo (born c. 1956), American former football player

== See also ==
- Costanzo
