= Eastern Washington University Press =

- Parent company: Eastern Washington University
- Status: defunct
- Defunct: 30 June 2010
- Successor: Carnegie Mellon University Press
- Country of origin: United States
- Headquarters location: Cheney, Washington
- Publication types: books
- Official website: ewupress.ewu.edu

Eastern Washington University Press (EWU Press) was a publishing house formed in the 1970s that was a part of Eastern Washington University. The press specialized in scholarly works about Asia and the environment; it also released works of fiction and translation of literature, including works by poets and writers such as Robert Bly, Carolyn Kizer, Dorianne Laux, and Joseph Millar.

In 2007, Eastern Washington University Press became a member of the Association of American University Presses. On June 30, 2010, the press ceased operation, and the publishing rights to many of its books were transferred to Carnegie Mellon University Press.

== See also ==
- List of English-language book publishing companies
- List of university presses
