= Lega Basket Serie A =

Top men's basketball league in Italy

- Founded: 1920; 106 years ago
- First season: 1920–21
- Country: Italy
- Federation: Lega Basket
- Confederation: FIBA Europe
- Number of teams: 16
- Level on pyramid: 1
- Relegation to: Serie A2
- Domestic cup: Coppa Italia
- Supercup: Supercoppa
- International cup(s): EuroLeague; EuroCup; Champions League; Europe Cup
- Current champions: Olimpia Milano (32nd title) (2025–26)
- Most championships: Olimpia Milano (32 titles)
- All-time top scorer: Antonello Riva (14,397)
- President: Maurizio Gherardini
- TV partners: LBA TV; Sky Sport
- Website: www.legabasket.it
- 2026–27 LBA season

The Lega Basket Serie A (LBA) is a professional men's club basketball league that has been organised in Italy since 1920. Serie A is organised by Lega Basket, which is regulated by the Italian Basketball Federation (FIP). It is the highest-tier level of the Italian league system. The LBA plays under FIBA rules and currently consists of 16 teams, with the lowest-placed team relegated to the Serie A2 and replaced by the winner of the play-offs of that tier.

A total of 99 teams have competed in the LBA since its inception. Seventeen teams have been crowned champions, with Olimpia Milano having won the title a record 31 times, and Virtus Bologna 17 times. According to FIBA Europe's and Euroleague Basketball's national league coefficients, the LBA was the historically top ranked national domestic league in Europe, for the period 1958 to 2007. Today, the LBA is considered to be one of the top European national basketball leagues. Its clubs have won the second most EuroLeague championships (13), the most FIBA Saporta Cups (15), and the most FIBA Korać Cups (10).

== History ==
=== First years ===
The first men's basketball championship was held in Italy in 1920, organized by the Royal Italian National Gymnastics Federation and won by S.E.F. Costanza Milano, led by Carlo Andreoli. However, the first championship officially organized by the newly formed Italian Basketball Federation (FIP) was instead contested in 1922. During the first years, Milan's teams dominated the league: in the initial six seasons, there were five successes for Assi Milano and one for Internazionale Milano. Between 1928 and 1935, Ginnastica Roma and Ginnastica Triestina alternatively won the championship.

In 1936, the championship was won by Olimpia Milano; the title was the first of 31 championships won by Olimpia over the decades. The team, coached by Giannino Valli, won four consecutive championships, only interrupted by Trieste in 1939–1940 and 1940–1941. In 1941–42 and 1942–43, the title was won by Reyer Venezia, however, the following two seasons were never held, due to the break out of World War II on Italian soil.

=== From 1945 to the 1970s ===
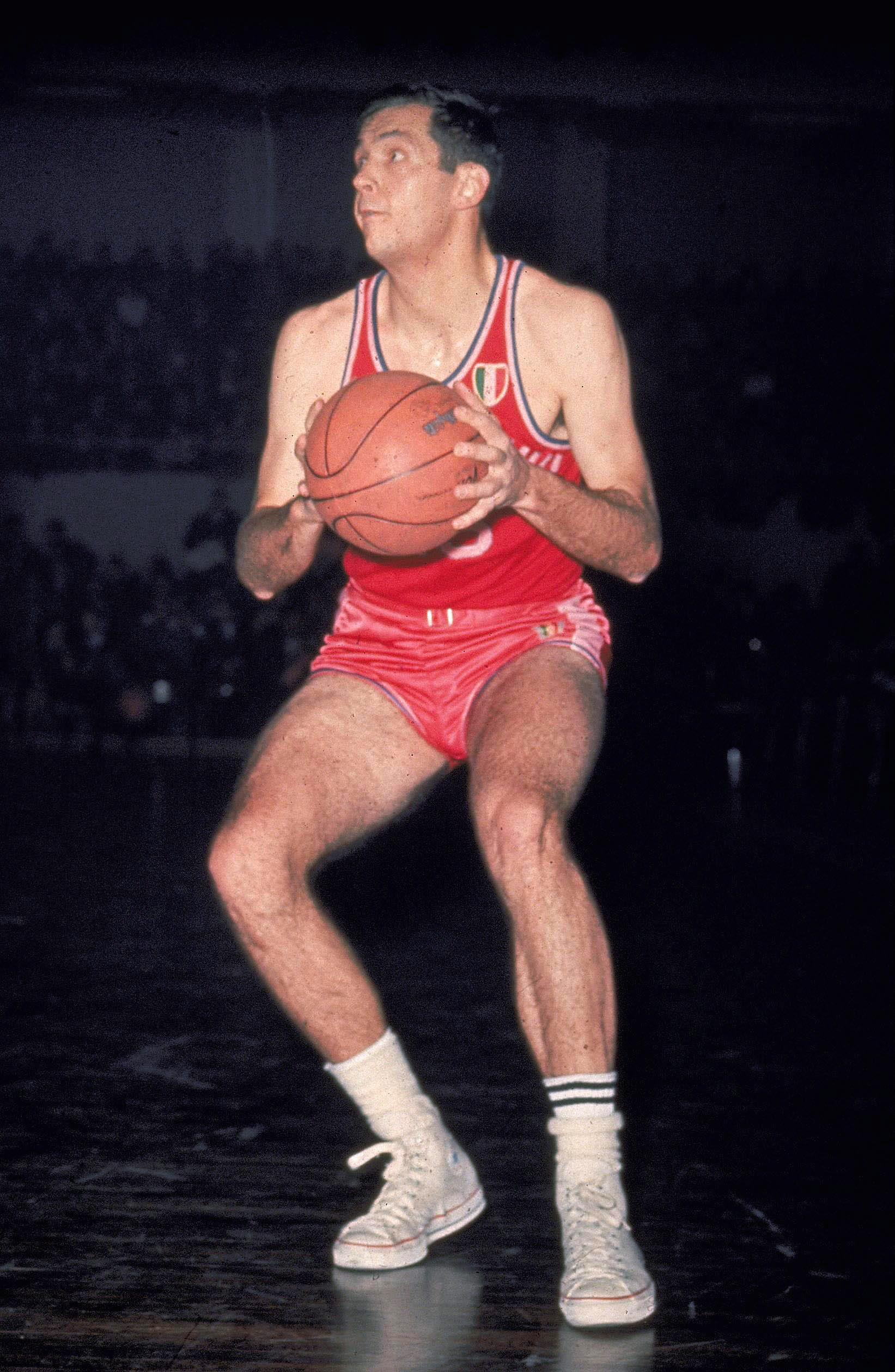
Bill Bradley with Simmenthal Milano in 1966.

At the end of the war, the league was characterized by the rise of Virtus Bologna, which won four consecutive seasons. Virtus would later become one of the most successful teams in Italy, capable of winning 16 titles through its history. From the 1949–50 season, the domination of Olimpia Milano began. Milan's team was able of winning 14 championships out of the 18 played up to 1966–67. The team, coached by Cesare Rubini, marked an unrepeatable dominance on the Italian league thanks to players like Sandro Gamba, Romeo Romanutti, Enrico Pagani and Bill Bradley. From 1954 to 1956, Virtus won the title again, achieving a so-called back-to-back under the leadership of Vittorio Tracuzzi, while in 1961 and 1964, Pallacanestro Varese was crowned Italian champion.

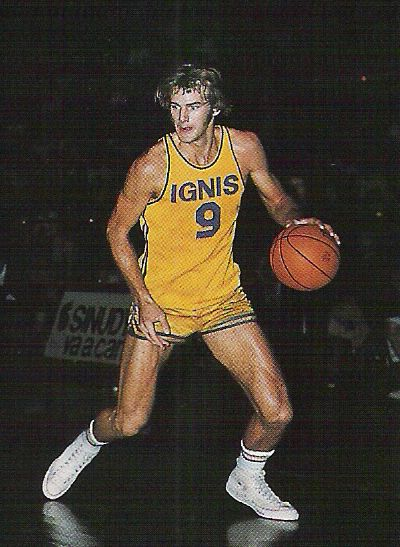
Bob Morse with Ignis Varese in 1973.

After the victory of Pallacanestro Cantù in 1968, Varese opened a new cycle of successes, winning 7 championships in 10 years, between 1968 and 1969 and 1977–78. The team, led by Aldo Ossola, Dino Meneghin, Bob Morse, Manuel Raga and coached by Aza Nikolić, was widely considered one of the best in the history of Italian basketball, capable of winning five European titles during the same period. Olimpia Milano and Cantù respectively won the championship in 1972 and 1975, while Virtus won the title in 1976, coached by Dan Peterson, and achieved a back-to-back in 1978–79 and 1979–80, thanks to Krešimir Ćosić, one of the best centers in Europe, Renato Villalta, Carlo Caglieris and the captain Gianni Bertolotti.

=== The Golden Age of 1980s and 1990s ===
The 1980s and the 1990s are widely considered as the "golden age" of Italian basketball; during these decades, the Italian championship became one of the most competitive in the world, often considered to be the second one after NBA. The 1980s were characterized by a predominance of Olimpia Milano. The so-called "red shoes" were capable of winning five titles between 1981 and 1989, thanks to outstanding players like Mike D'Antoni, Bob McAdoo and Dino Meneghin. Cantù won its third title in 1981, while Virtus Roma won its first and only championship in 1983, under the leadership of the American point guard Larry Wright. In the 1983–84 season, Virtus Bologna won its tenth national title, defeating Olimpia Milano in the finals, while Victoria Libertas Pesaro was crowned Italian champion twice in 1988 and 1990. The 1990s began with the historic success of Nando Gentile and Vincenzo Esposito's Phonola Caserta; as of today, this title is still the only one won by a team from Southern Italy. While the 1991–92 season was won by Toni Kukoč's Benetton Treviso. However, the 1990s were deeply marked by the dominance of Virtus Bologna: the "Black V" was able of winning four titles from 1992 to 1998, thanks to its Serbian star, Predrag Danilović, but also important players like Antoine Rigaudeau, Alessandro Abbio and Zoran Savić. Treviso won the title again in 1997, while Varese won its tenth national championship in 1999, thanks to young and talented players like Andrea Meneghin and Gianmarco Pozzecco.

=== The league through the 2000s and 2010s ===
The 1999–2000 championship was won by Carlton Myers's Fortitudo Bologna, winning for the first time after three consecutive lost finals between 1995 and 1996 and 1997–98. In the following season, Virtus Bologna of Manu Ginóbili was crowned national champion once again. Moreover, the Black V was able of winning both the Italian Cup and the EuroLeague, achieving a so-called Triple Crown (known in Italy as Grande Slam). From 2002 to 2006, the Serie A was marked by a harsh rivalry between Benetton Treviso and Fortitudo Bologna: Treviso won the title in 2002, 2003 and 2006, always defeating Fortitudo in the national finals; Bologna's team won the title in 2005 against Olimpia Milano.

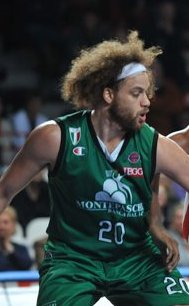
Shaun Stonerook with Montepaschi Siena in 2012.

In 2004, Mens Sana Siena won its first title, but it was only three years later, in 2007, that Siena would begun its dominance over the Italian league. From 2007 to 2013, the Tuscan team was able of winning seven consecutive titles, under the leaderships of Terrell McIntyre, Shaun Stonerook and Romain Sato. However, on 7 October 2016, following an investigation for accounting and fiscal fraud, the Court of the Italian Basketball Federation has revoked the championship titles awarded to Siena for the 2011–12 and 2012–13 seasons, two Italian Cups (2012 and 2013) and the 2013 Supercoppa. Following Siena's relegation, Olimpia Milano, under the new ownership of Giorgio Armani, won the championship again in 2014, 2016 and 2018, while Dinamo Sassari won its first title in 2015, becoming the first team from Sardinia to do so. In 2017 and 2019, Reyer Venezia returned to the top of Italian league after more than seven decades.

=== Recent seasons ===
The 2019–20 regular season saw a strong prominence of Virtus Bologna, however, the season was cancelled prematurely because of the COVID-19 pandemic and, for the first time since 1945, the Italian league did not award the title. In the following season, Miloš Teodosić's Virtus Bologna won its 16th title, defeating 4–0 its historic rival Olimpia Milano in the national finals. It was Virtus's first title after twenty years. In the following season, in a rematch of the latest finals, Olimpia Milano defeated Virtus Bologna 4–2.

== Title sponsorships ==
From 1993 to 2022, the LBA had title sponsorship rights sold to ten companies; UnipolSal was the most recent title sponsor, having sponsored the LBA from 2020 to the present.

Period	Sponsor	Name
1993–1996	Luxottica	Luxottica Cup
1996–1998	Polo	Polo Cup
1998–1999	Ford Puma	Ford Puma Trophy
1999–2000	SportWeek	SportWeek Cup
2000–2003	Foxy	Foxy Cup
2003–2009	TIM	Serie A TIM
2009–2012	Agos Ducato	Agos Ducato Serie A
2012–2016	Beko	Serie A Beko
2016	No sponsor	LBA
2016–2019	PosteMobile	PosteMobile Serie A
2019–2020	No sponsor	LBA
2020–present	UnipolSai	LBA UnipolSai

Following the end of the 2015–16 season, LBA has a new sponsor. The Turkish brand Beko left LBA after four years of sponsorship, and all its other basketball team sponsorships in Europe. Beko would focus on their sponsorship of the Spanish football team Barcelona.

In December 2016, President Egidio Bianchi had communicated to have reached an agreement with PosteMobile to become the title sponsor of the LBA. In July 2019, LBA announced that the agreement with PosteMobile for LBA ended on 30 June.

== Competition format ==
Scudetto patch

The competition format follows a double round-robin format. During the course of a season, which lasts from October to May, each club plays each other twice (once at home and once away), for a total of 30 games. Teams rankings at season end is determined by receiving two points for a win and no points for a loss. At season end, the eight top teams play-off, pitting the first place standings team against the 8th place team, and so on.

There are three playoff rounds. The Quarterfinals are best of five, while the semi-finals and finals series are best of seven (in the 2012–13 season, all series were best-of-seven). The winner of the finals round is the champion of the LBA.

At season's end, the last qualified club of the regular season is relegated to Serie A2 Basket, and replaced by the winner of the playoffs of this league.

=== Arena rules ===
LBA clubs must play in arenas that seat at least 3,500 people. From 2017 to 2018 season, clubs must host their home playoffs matches in arenas that have a seating capacity of at least 5,000 people.

=== Clubs composition ===
Each team is allowed either five or seven foreign players under two formulas:

1. 5 foreigners from countries outside the European Union
2. 3 foreigners from countries outside the E.U., 4 foreigners from E.U. countries (also including those from countries signatory of the Cotonou Agreement)

Each club can choose the 5+5 formula, that consists of five Italian players and five foreign players, and the 3+4+5 formula, with five Italian players, three foreigners from countries outside the E.U. and four foreigners from E.U. countries or "Cotonou Countries".

At the end of the season there is a prize of €500,000 for the top three ranked teams, that had chosen the 5+5 formula, considering the playing time of Italian players, and €200,000 for those teams that will obtain the best results with their youth sector.

=== Qualifying for European competitions ===
In summer 2016, four Italian teams (Reggio Emilia, Trento, Sassari and Cantù) were forced to withdraw from EuroCup because of the FIBA and Euroleague Basketball controversy.

From 2017 to 2018 season, Italian Basketball Federation would allow LBA clubs to rejoin EuroCup. There will be at least six teams in Europe. One in EuroLeague (Olimpia Milano directly enter the EuroLeague as licensed club), two in EuroCup (but they are negotiating with ECA for a third spot) and three in Basketball Champions League. Lega Basket decided Italian Clubs will be free to choose in which European Cup they want to play, based on final ranking and sports merit.

== Media ==
=== Italy ===
From 2025-26 until 2027-28, all games are broadcast live on LBATV streaming service with selected live games on Sky Sport.

=== International ===
Territory	Network
Unsold markets	YouTube
Australia	Euroleague TV
Austria	Euroleague TV
Belgium	Euroleague TV
Bulgaria	Euroleague TV
Denmark	Euroleague TV
Finland	Euroleague TV
Germany	Euroleague TV
Hungary	Euroleague TV
Netherlands	Euroleague TV
Norway	Euroleague TV
Portugal	Euroleague TV
Romania	Euroleague TV
Sweden	Euroleague TV
Switzerland	Euroleague TV
Turkey	Euroleague TV
United Arab Emirates	Euroleague TV
United Kingdom	Euroleague TV
Bosnia and Herzegovina	Arena Sport
Croatia	Arena Sport
Montenegro	Arena Sport
North Macedonia	Arena Sport
Serbia	Arena Sport
Slovenia	Arena Sport
Estonia	Setanta Sports
Latvia	Setanta Sports
Lithuania	Setanta Sports
Greece	Cosmote Sport
Israel	Charlton
Poland	Polsat Sport
Ukraine	Maincast
United States	Napoli Basket TV

== Current clubs ==
=== Venues and locations ===
Location of teams in 2026–27 LBA season

Team	Home city	Arena	Capacity
APU Udine	Udine	PalaCarnera	3,500
Aquila Basket Trento	Trento	BLM Group Arena	4,360
BC Roma	Rome	Palazzetto dello Sport	3,500
Derthona Basket	Tortona	Nova Arena	5,000
Maxima Roma	Rome	Pala EUR	11,200
Napoli Basket	Naples	PalaBarbuto	5,500
Olimpia Milano	Milan	Mediolanum Forum	12,800
Pallacanestro Cantù	Cantù	Palasport Pianella	3,910
Pallacanestro Reggiana	Reggio Emilia	PalaBigi	4,550
Pallacanestro Trieste	Trieste	PalaTrieste	6,943
Pallacanestro Varese	Varese	Palasport Lino Oldrini	5,300
Reyer Venezia	Venice	Palasport Taliercio	3,509
Scafati Basket	Scafati	PalaMangano	3,700
Scaligera Verona	Verona	Pala Magis	5,350
Treviso Basket	Treviso	PalaVerde	5,344
Virtus Bologna	Bologna	Unipol Hall	11,000

== List of champions ==
- 1920: Costanza
- 1921: Assi Milano
- 1922: Assi Milano
- 1923: Internazionale Milano
- 1924: Assi Milano
- 1925: Assi Milano
- 1926: Assi Milano
- 1927: Assi Milano
- 1928: Ginnastica Roma
- 1929: not held
- 1930: Ginnastica Triestina
- 1931: Ginnastica Roma
- 1932: Ginnastica Triestina
- 1933: Ginnastica Roma
- 1934: Ginnastica Triestina
- 1935: Ginnastica Roma
- 1935–36: Borletti Milano
- 1936–37: Borletti Milano
- 1937–38: Borletti Milano
- 1938–39: Borletti Milano
- 1939–40: Ginnastica Triestina
- 1940–41: Ginnastica Triestina
- 1941–42: Reyer Venezia
- 1942–43: Reyer Venezia
- 1943–44: not held due to World War II
- 1944–45: not held due to World War II
- 1945–46: Virtus Bologna
- 1946–47: Virtus Bologna
- 1947–48: Virtus Bologna
- 1948–49: Virtus Bologna
- 1949–50: Borletti Milano
- 1950–51: Borletti Milano
- 1951–52: Borletti Milano
- 1952–53: Borletti Milano
- 1953–54: Borletti Milano
- 1954–55: Minganti Bologna
- 1955–56: Minganti Bologna
- 1956–57: Simmenthal Milano
- 1957–58: Simmenthal Milano
- 1958–59: Simmenthal Milano
- 1959–60: Simmenthal Milano
- 1960–61: Ignis Varese
- 1961–62: Simmenthal Milano
- 1962–63: Simmenthal Milano
- 1963–64: Ignis Varese
- 1964–65: Simmenthal Milano
- 1965–66: Simmenthal Milano
- 1966–67: Simmenthal Milano
- 1967–68: Oransoda Cantù
- 1968–69: Ignis Varese
- 1969–70: Ignis Varese
- 1970–71: Ignis Varese
- 1971–72: Simmenthal Milano
- 1972–73: Ignis Varese
- 1973–74: Ignis Varese
- 1974–75: Birra Forst Cantù
- 1975–76: Sinudyne Bologna
- 1976–77: Mobilgirgi Varese
- 1977–78: Mobilgirgi Varese
- 1978–79: Sinudyne Bologna
- 1979–80: Sinudyne Bologna
- 1980–81: Squibb Cantù
- 1981–82: Billy Milano
- 1982–83: Banco di Roma
- 1983–84: Granarolo Bologna
- 1984–85: Simac Milano
- 1985–86: Simac Milano
- 1986–87: Tracer Milano
- 1987–88: Scavolini Pesaro
- 1988–89: Philips Milano
- 1989–90: Scavolini Pesaro
- 1990–91: Phonola Caserta
- 1991–92: Benetton Treviso
- 1992–93: Knorr Bologna
- 1993–94: Buckler Beer Bologna
- 1994–95: Buckler Beer Bologna
- 1995–96: Stefanel Milano
- 1996–97: Benetton Treviso
- 1997–98: Kinder Bologna
- 1998–99: Varese Roosters
- 1999–00: Paf Wennington Bologna
- 2000–01: Kinder Bologna
- 2001–02: Benetton Treviso
- 2002–03: Benetton Treviso
- 2003–04: Montepaschi Siena
- 2004–05: Climamio Bologna
- 2005–06: Benetton Treviso
- 2006–07: Montepaschi Siena
- 2007–08: Montepaschi Siena
- 2008–09: Montepaschi Siena
- 2009–10: Montepaschi Siena
- 2010–11: Montepaschi Siena
- 2011–12: ~~Montepaschi Siena~~ (revoked)
- 2012–13: ~~Montepaschi Siena~~ (revoked)
- 2013–14: EA7 Emporio Armani Milano
- 2014–15: Banco di Sardegna Sassari
- 2015–16: EA7 Emporio Armani Milano
- 2016–17: Umana Reyer Venezia
- 2017–18: EA7 Emporio Armani Milano
- 2018–19: Umana Reyer Venezia
- 2019–20: cancelled due to COVID-19 pandemic
- 2020–21: Virtus Segafredo Bologna
- 2021–22: AX Armani Exchange Milano
- 2022–23: AX Armani Exchange Milano
- 2023–24: AX Armani Exchange Milano
- 2024–25: Virtus Segafredo Bologna
- 2025–26: EA7 Emporio Armani Milano

== Performance by club ==
Club	Winners	Championship seasons
**Olimpia Milano**	32	1935–36, 1936–37, 1937–38, 1938–39, 1949–50, 1950–51, 1951–52, 1952–53, 1953–54, 1956–57, 1957–58, 1958–59, 1959–60, 1961–62, 1962–63, 1964–65, 1965–66, 1966–67, 1971–72, 1981–82, 1984–85, 1985–86, 1986–87, 1988–89, 1995–96, 2013–14, 2015–16, 2017–18, 2021–22, 2022–23, 2023–24, 2025-26
**Virtus Bologna**	17	1945–46, 1946–47, 1947–48, 1948–49, 1954–55, 1955–56, 1975–76, 1978–79, 1979–80, 1983–84, 1992–93, 1993–94, 1994–95, 1997–98, 2000–01, 2020–21, 2024–25
**Varese**	10	1960–61, 1963–64, 1968–69, 1969–70, 1970–71, 1972–73, 1973–74, 1976–77, 1977–78, 1998–99
Mens Sana 1871	6	2003–04, 2006–07, 2007–08, 2008–09, 2009–10, 2010–11
Assi Milano	6	1921, 1922, 1924, 1925, 1926, 1927
**Trieste** (formerly Ginnastica Triestina)	5	1930, 1932, 1934, 1939–40, 1940–41
Treviso	5	1991–92, 1996–97, 2001–02, 2002–03, 2005–06
Ginnastica Roma	4	1928, 1931, 1933, 1935
**Reyer Venezia**	4	1941–42, 1942–43, 2016–17, 2018–19
**Cantù**	3	1967–68, 1974–75, 1980–81
**Victoria Libertas**	2	1987–88, 1989–90
**Fortitudo Bologna**	2	1999–00, 2004–05
Costanza	1	1920
Internazionale Milano	1	1923
Virtus Roma	1	1982–83
JuveCaserta	1	1990–91
**Dinamo Sassari**	1	2014–15

Bold indicates clubs which will play in the 2020–21 LBA season.

== Individual awards ==
- LBA Most Valuable Player Award
- LBA Finals Valuable Player Award
- LBA Best Player Under 22
- LBA Best Coach
- LBA Best Executive
- LBA Defensive Player of the Year
