= Costanza (disambiguation) =

Costanza is a feminine given name

Costanza may also refer to:

- Costanza (surname), an Italian surname
- Santa Costanza, a church in Rome
- S.E.F. Costanza, defunct Italian basketball team

== Fictional characters ==
- In the American sitcom Seinfeld:
  - George Costanza, one of the main characters
    - Estelle Costanza, his mother
    - Frank Costanza, his father
- the title character of Costanza / Costanzo, an Italian literary fairy tale

== See also ==
- Constanza (disambiguation)
- Costanzo (disambiguation)
