= James Reiss =

American poet

- Born: July 11, 1941; Washington Heights, Manhattan, New York, U.S.
- Died: December 2, 2016 (aged 75); Wilmette, Illinois, U.S.

Academic background
- Education: University of Chicago (BA, MA)

Academic work
- Discipline: English literature
- Institutions: Queens College; Miami University

James Reiss (/riːs/ REESS; July 11, 1941 – December 2, 2016) was an American poet and novelist.

== Early life and education ==
Reiss grew up in the Washington Heights neighborhood of New York City and in northern New Jersey. He earned his Bachelor of Arts and Master of Arts in English from the University of Chicago.

== Career ==
Reiss's poems have appeared in magazines that include The Atlantic, Esquire, The Nation, The New Republic, The New Yorker, Poetry, Slate, HuffPost, and Virginia Quarterly Review.

Reiss won grants from the Creative Artists Public Service Program of the New York State Council on the Arts, the National Endowment for the Arts, the New York Foundation for the Arts and the Ohio Arts Council. He has received awards from, among others, the Academy of American Poets, the Poetry Society of America, the Pushcart Press and the Unterberg Poetry Center of the 92nd Street Y. From 1971 to 1974, he was a regular poetry critic for The Plain Dealer in Cleveland, Ohio. In 1977, he won first prize in New York’s Big Apple Bicentennial Poetry Contest. He won four annual Zeitfunk awards for his reviewing between 2007 and 2010, from the Public Radio Exchange.

In 1975 and 1976, Reiss taught as poet-in-residence at Queens College, City University of New York. Reiss was also a professor emeritus of English and the founding editor of the Miami University Press at Miami University in Oxford, Ohio.

== Personal life ==
At the time of his death, he lived in Wilmette, Illinois, near Chicago.

== Bibliography ==
=== Books ===
- Façade for a Penny Arcade [Spuyten Duyvil Publishing|Spuyten Duyvil], 2017)
- When Yellow Leaves [Spuyten Duyvil Publishing|Spuyten Duyvil], 2016)
- The Novel (WordTech Communications, 2015)
- Greatest Hits: 1970-2005 (Pudding House Press, 2005)
- Riff on Six: New and Selected Poems (Salt Publishing, 2003)
- Ten Thousand Good Mornings (Carnegie Mellon University Press, 2001)
- The Parable of Fire (Carnegie Mellon University Press, 1996)
- Express (University of Pittsburgh Press, 1983)
- The Breathers (Ecco Press, 1974)
- Self-Interviews: James Dickey, co-ed. (Doubleday, 1970; Louisiana State University Press, 1984)
