= Johanny Vazquez Paz =

Puerto Rican poet (born 1960)

Johanny Vázquez Paz
- Born: Johanny Vázquez Paz; 1960 (age 65–66); San Juan, Puerto Rico
- Education: Indiana State University (B.A., sociology, 1984), University of Illinois at Chicago (M.A., Hispanic Studies)
- Occupations: Poet, short story writer and professor
- Writing career
- Notable awards: International Latino Book Award, PEN/Beyond Margins Award, Pushcart Prize

Johanny Vázquez Paz (born 1960) is a Puerto Rican poet, narrator and professor.

== Biography ==
Johanny Vázquez Paz was born and raised in San Juan, Puerto Rico. She received her primary and secondary education in Catholic schools in Santurce. This experience and her journeys through the different barrios of Santurce have been sources of inspiration for many poems and stories she has written and published. In 1979 she left for the United States to complete a bachelor's degree in sociology from Indiana State University in Terre Haute, Indiana. Upon completing her baccalaureate she returned to Puerto Rico until 1986 when she moved to Chicago, Illinois. In Chicago she completed a master's degree in Hispanic Studies with a specialization in literature at the University of Illinois at Chicago. Currently she is a professor of Spanish at Harold Washington College in Chicago.

In 2001, Vásquez Paz co-edited the anthology Between the Heart and the Land/Entre el corazón y la tierra: Latina Poets in the Midwest by the Chicano poet Brenda Cárdenas. The anthology won first prize from the organization Chicago Women in Publishing in 2002.

In 2007, the New York editorial Mayapple Press published her bilingual poetry book Poemas callejeros/Streetwise Poems which won honorable mention in the Butterfly Award category for first book published at the International Latino Book Awards in California in 2008. It was also nominated for the 2007 PEN/Beyond Margins Award and 2007 Pushcart Prize. The poem "Cada familia", included in the book, was put to music by Argentine composer Luis Jahn and included in his CD Compromiso.

The Spanish editorial Ediciones Torremozas published her book Querido voyeur in 2012, making her the fifth Puerto Rican poet included in its prestigious collection of poetry. In February 2013 Aguijón Theater Company of Chicago staged a theatrical presentation based on the poems in Querido voyeur.

In November 2012, Vásquez Paz received first prize in the poetry category of the Poetry and Short Story Competition of the Northeastern Illinois University for her collection of poems titled Sagrada familia. She also received second prize for her story La muda.

Her book Sagrada familia was published by the Puerto Rican editorial Isla Negra Editores in 2014, and selected by the newspaper El Nuevo Día as one of the most memorable books of the year. Sagrada familia won first prize in the best book of poetry category at the International Latino Book Awards 2015.

Her work has been included in the anthologies:

- Trasfondos: Antología de narrativa en español del medio oeste norteamericano (ArsCommunis Editorial, 2014)
- City of Big Shoulders (University of Iowa Press, 2012)
- Ejército de rosas (Boreales, 2011)
- En la 18 a la 1 (Vocesueltas, 2010)
- The City Visible: Chicago Poetry for the New Century (Cracked Slab Books, 2007)
- Poetas sin tregua–Compilación de poetas puertorriqueñas de la generación del 80 (Ráfagas, España, 2006)
- Más allá de las fronteras (Ediciones Nuevo Espacio, New Jersey, 2004)

Vazquez Paz has also been published in magazines such as:

- Triqueterly Magazine, International Poetry Review (University of North Carolina)
- VOCES Journal (University of California)
- El Centro Journal of the Center for Puerto Rican Studies (Hunter College, New York City)
- Beyond Borders y Diálogo (De Paul University)
- Revistas Boreales, Identidad y Yagrumal (Puerto Rico)
