= Jacqueline Kolosov =

American poet

- Born: Chicago, Illinois, U.S.
- Education: University of Chicago (BA, MA); New York University (PhD)
- Occupations: Poet; author; professor
- Spouse: William Wenthe
- Children: 1
- Writing career
- Genre: Children's literature

Jacqueline Kolosov (born in Chicago) is an American poet, children's book author, and professor. Her most recent collection of poetry is Modigliani's Muse (WordTech Communications, 2009), and her most recent young adult novel is A Sweet Disorder (Hyperion Books, 2009). Her poetry has appeared in literary journals and magazines including The Southern Review, Shenandoah, Poetry, Passages North Orion, PRISM International, The Malahat Review, Ecotone, and Western Humanities Review, and her honors include a fellowship from the National Endowment for the Arts.

She was raised in and around Chicago and graduated from University of Chicago with a B.A. and an M.A., and from New York University with a Ph.D. She teaches currently at Texas Tech University. She lives in West Texas with husband, poet William Wenthe, and their daughter Sophia. Jacqueline is a vegetarian and loves to ride horses.

== Honors and awards ==
- 2008 NEA Literature Fellowship
- 2005 Glen Workshop Fellowship, Image Magazine
- 1992-1996 Multi-Year Fellowship, New York University

== Published works ==
Full-Length Poetry Collections

- Modigliani's Muse. WordTech Communications. 2009. ISBN 978-1-934999-50-9.
- Vago. Lewis-Clark Press / Sandhills Press. 2007. ISBN 978-0-911015-82-9.

Chapbooks

- Souvenir, Modigliani. Winnow Press. 2005. ISBN 978-0-9764726-1-2.
- Why Plant Bougainvillea. Finishing Line Press. 2005. ISBN 978-1-932755-67-1.
- Fabergé, Finishing Line Press, 2003
- Danish Ocean, Pudding House Press, 2003

Juvenile Fiction

- A Sweet Disorder. Hyperion Books CH. 2009. ISBN 978-1-4231-1245-7.
- The Red Queen's Daughter. Hyperion. 2007. ISBN 978-1-4231-0797-2.
- Grace from China. Yeong & Yeong Book Co. 2004. ISBN 978-0-9638472-8-7.

Juvenile Nonfiction

- Jacqueline McLean; Jacqueline A. Kolosov (2001). Women with wings. Minneapolis, Minnesota: The Oliver Press, Inc. ISBN 978-1-881508-70-0.
- Jacqueline A. Kolosov; Jacqueline McLean (2003). Women of Adventure. Minneapolis, Minnesota: The Oliver Press, Inc. ISBN 978-1-881508-73-1.
- Jacqueline McLean; Jacqueline A. Kolosov (1999). Victoria Woodhull: First Woman Presidential Candidate. Morgan Reynolds. ISBN 978-1-883846-47-3.

Anthologies Edited

- Lou Halsell Rodenberger; Laura Payne Butler; Jacqueline A. Kolosov, eds. (2005). Writing on the wind: an anthology of West Texas women writers. Texas Tech University Press. ISBN 978-0-89672-548-5.

Cookbooks

- Cooking with Horse, Self-Published, 2010
