= William Wenthe =

American poet and professor

William Wenthe is an American poet and professor. He is currently a Horn Distinguished Professor of Creative Writing at Texas Tech University. His most recent poetry collection is Words Before Dawn (Louisiana State University Press, 2013). His poems have appeared in literary journals and magazines including Georgia Review, Southern Review, Callaloo, Tin House, Paris Review, Poetry, and in anthologies including Poets on Place (Utah State University Press, 2005). His honors include a Pushcart Prize and fellowships from the National Endowment for the Arts and the Texas Commission on the Arts.

Born and raised in New Jersey, Wenthe earned his B.A. from College of the Holy Cross, and his M.A. and Ph.D. from the University of Virginia. He lives in Lubbock with his wife, the poet Jacqueline Kolosov, and their daughter Sophia. He is the poetry editor for Iron Horse Literary Review.

== Published works ==
- Words Before Dawn (Louisiana State University Press, 2012)
- Not Till We Are Lost (Louisiana State University Press, 2003)
- Birds of Hoboken (Orchises Press, 1995)

== Honors and awards ==
- 2009 Everett Southwest Literary Award
- 2004 Natalie Ornish Best Book of Poetry Award
- 1995 National Endowment for the Arts Fellowship
