= Efraín Morales Sánchez =

Mexican politician

- Born: 27 June 1953 (age 72); Iztapalapa, Mexico City, Mexico
- Occupation: Politician
- Political party: PRD

Efraín Morales Sánchez (born 27 June 1953) is a Mexican politician affiliated with the Party of the Democratic Revolution. In 2006–2009 he served as a federal deputy in the 60th Congress, representing the Federal District's 20th congressional district.
