= 20th federal electoral district of Mexico City =

Federal electoral district of Mexico

Mexico City's 20th
- Electoral district of the Chamber of Deputies of Mexico

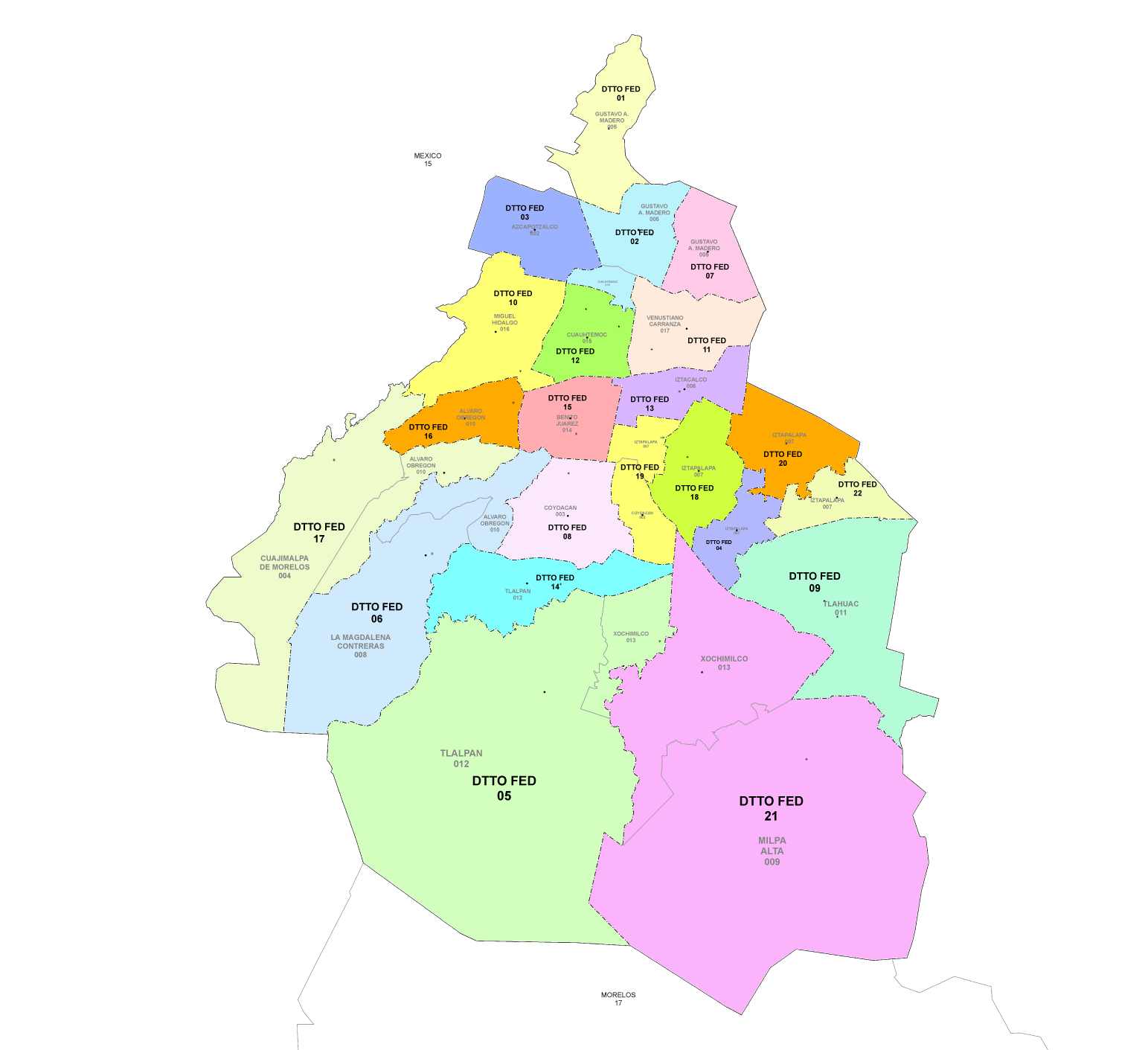
- 20th district since 2023

Incumbent
- Member: Ana Karina Rojo Pimentel
- Party: ▌Labour Party
- Congress: 66th (2024–2027)

District
- State: Mexico City
- Head town: Iztapalapa
- Coordinates: 19°21′30″N 99°05′35″W
- Covers: Iztapalapa (part)
- PR region: Fourth
- Precincts: 278
- Population: 477,773 (2020 census)

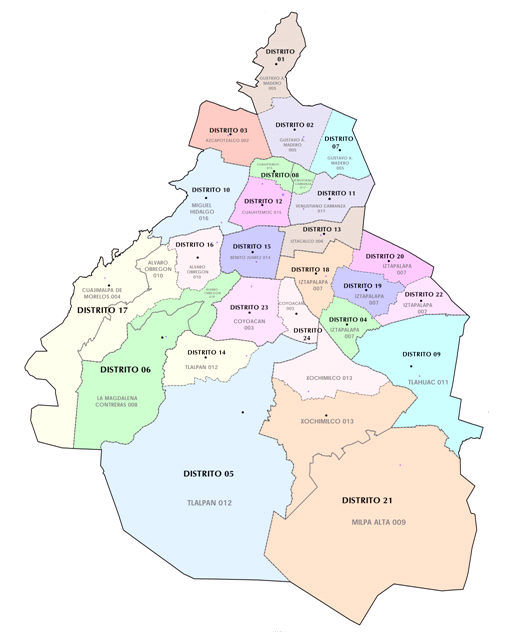
Mexico City under the 2017–2022 districting plan

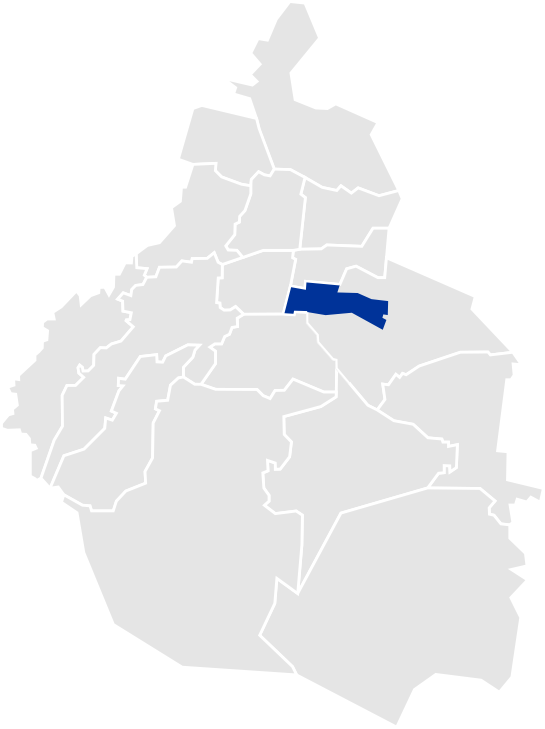
2005–2017 20th district shaded blue

The 20th federal electoral district of Mexico City (Spanish: Distrito electoral federal 20 de la Ciudad de México; previously "of the Federal District") is one of the 300 electoral districts into which Mexico is divided for elections to the federal Chamber of Deputies and one of the 22 currently operational districts in Mexico City.

It elects one deputy to the lower house of Congress for each three-year legislative session by means of the first past the post system. Votes cast in the district also count towards the calculation of proportional representation ("plurinominal") deputies elected from the fourth region.

The current member for the district, elected in the 2024 general election, is Ana Karina Rojo Pimentel of the Labour Party (PT).

== District territory ==
Under the 2023 districting plan adopted by the National Electoral Institute (INE), which is to be used for the 2024, 2027 and 2030 federal elections, the 20th district covers 278 electoral precincts (secciones electorales) across the north-eastern portion of the borough (alcaldía) of Iztapalapa.

The district reported a population of 477,773 in the 2020 census.

== Previous districting schemes ==
Evolution of electoral district numbers
	1974	1978	1996	2005	2017	2023
Mexico City (Federal District)	27	40	30	27	24	22
Chamber of Deputies	196	300				

2017–2022

In the 2017 plan, the 20th district comprised 199 precincts in the north-east of Iztapalapa.

2005–2017

Between 2005 and 2017, the district covered 234 precincts in the centre and west of Iztapalapa.

1996–2005

Under the 1996 scheme, the district covered 212 precincts in the centre and west of Iztapalapa.

1978–1996

The districting scheme in force from 1978 to 1996 was the result of the 1977 electoral reforms, which increased the number of single-member seats in the Chamber of Deputies from 196 to 300. Under that plan, the Federal District's seat allocation rose from 27 to 40. The 20th district covered a part of the borough of Gustavo A. Madero.

== Deputies returned to Congress ==
(Mexico) National parties
- Current
- PAN
- PRI
- PT
- PVEM
- MC
- Morena
- PAZ
- Somos
- Defunct or local only
- PLM
- PNR
- PRM
- PNM
- PP
- PPS
- PARM
- PFCRN
- CON
- PANAL
- PSD
- PES
- PES
- PRD

Mexico City's 20th district
Election	Deputy	Party	Term	Legislature
1961	Renaldo Guzmán Orozco	Institutional Revolutionary Party	1961–1964	45th Congress
1964	Antonio Martínez Manautou	Institutional Revolutionary Party	1964–1967	46th Congress
1967	Ignacio Guzmán Garduño	Institutional Revolutionary Party	1967–1970	47th Congress
1970	Oscar Hammeken Martínez	Institutional Revolutionary Party	1970–1973	48th Congress
1973	Ricardo Castañeda Gutiérrez	Institutional Revolutionary Party	1973–1976	49th Congress
1976	Jesús González Balandrano	Institutional Revolutionary Party	1976–1979	50th Congress
1979	Ricardo Castañeda Gutiérrez	Institutional Revolutionary Party	1979–1982	51st Congress
1982	Mateo de Regil Rodríguez	Institutional Revolutionary Party	1982–1985	52nd Congress
1985	Antonio Punzo Gaona	Institutional Revolutionary Party	1985–1988	53rd Congress
1988	Sóstenes Melgarejo Fraga	National Action Party (Mexico)	1988–1991	54th Congress
1991	Silvestre Fernández Barajas	Institutional Revolutionary Party	1991–1994	55th Congress
1994	Adolfo Ramón Flores Rodríguez	Institutional Revolutionary Party	1994–1997	56th Congress
1997	Benito Mirón Lince	Party of the Democratic Revolution	1997–2000	57th Congress
2000	Mónica Leticia Serrano Peña	National Action Party (Mexico)	2000–2003	58th Congress
2003	Diana Bernal Ladrón de Guevara	Party of the Democratic Revolution	2003–2006	59th Congress
2006	Efraín Morales Sánchez	Party of the Democratic Revolution	2006–2009	60th Congress
2009	Mario di Costanzo	Labour Party (Mexico)	2009–2012	61st Congress
2012	José Alberto Benavides Castañeda	Labour Party (Mexico)	2012–2015	62nd Congress
2015	Araceli Damián González	National Regeneration Movement	2015–2018	63rd Congress
2018	Ana Karina Rojo Pimentel	Labour Party (Mexico)	2018–2021	64th Congress
2021	Ana Karina Rojo Pimentel	Labour Party (Mexico)	2021–2024	65th Congress
2024	Ana Karina Rojo Pimentel	Labour Party (Mexico)	2024–2027	66th Congress

== Presidential elections ==
Mexico City's 20th district
Election	District won by	Party or coalition	%
2018	Andrés Manuel López Obrador	Juntos Haremos Historia	63.0812
2024	Claudia Sheinbaum Pardo	Sigamos Haciendo Historia	68.3626
