= Myra Sklarew =

American biologist and poet (1934–2024)

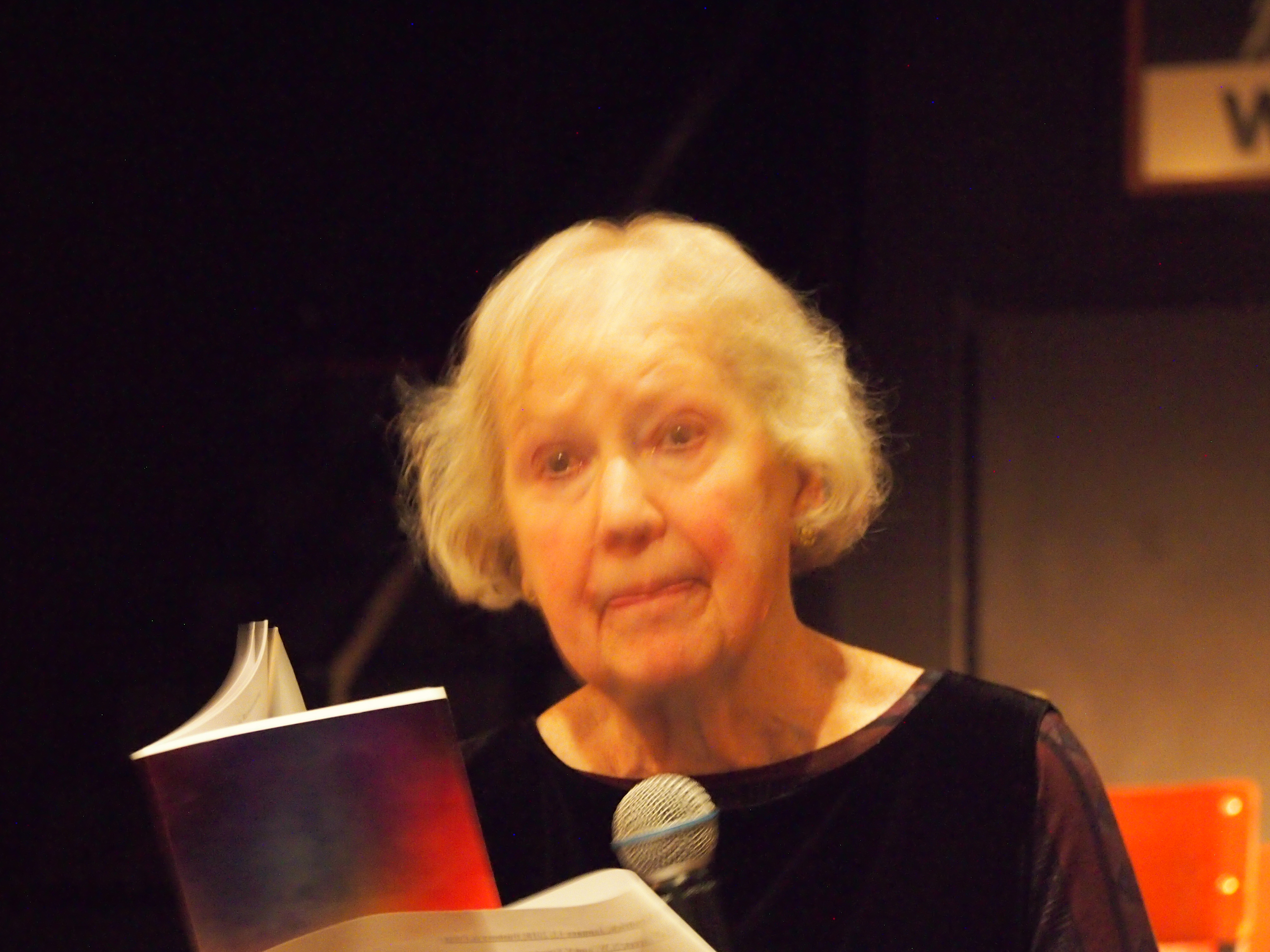
Myra Sklarew

Myra Weisberg Sklarew (December 18, 1934 – December 30, 2024) was an American biologist, poet and teacher.

== Life and career ==
Sklarew was born in Baltimore, Maryland in 1934. She began writing poetry at the age of 7 or 8, in part because of her frequent long stays at home due to reoccurring strep throat infections.

She received a biology degree from Tufts University, in 1956. She studied bacterial genetics and bacterial viruses with Salvador Luria and Max Delbrück at the Cold Spring Harbor Laboratory. In 1961, she moved to Bethesda, Maryland with her family. She later studied with Elliott Coleman at the Johns Hopkins University Writing Seminars, where she received an M.A. in 1970. After that, she began teaching at American University, and taught there from 1970 to 2007, except for a four-year stint, from 1987 to 1991, where she served as president of the Yaddo artist community.

Sklarew was the author of three chapbooks, and six collections of poetry. Her poems are in the Contemporary Poets Archive at the Library of Congress, while her papers are in the University of Maryland Archives.

After her retirement in 2007, Sklarew was emerita professor of literature in the writing program at American University.

Sklarew died due to complications from Crohn’s disease on December 30, 2024, at the age of 89.

== Bibliography ==
- A survivor named trauma: Holocaust memory in Lithuania (SUNY Press, forthcoming)
- If You Want to Live Forever Chapbook, 2012, in Ashes Caught on the Edge of Light, Winterhawk Press
- Harmless (Mayapple Press, 2010), ISBN 9780932412898
- The Journey of Child Development: Selected Papers of Dr. Joseph Nospitz, Routledge, 2010, co-editor with Bruce Sklarew
- Over the Rooftops of Time: Jewish Stories, Essays, Poems (SUNY Press, 2002) ISBN 9780791455753
- The Witness Trees: Poetry and Essays (Cornwall Books, 2000) ISBN 9780845348901
- Lithuania: New & Selected Poems (Azul Editions, 1995, 1997), ISBN 9781885214027
- Like a Field Riddled by Ants (Lost Road Publishers, 1987), ISBN 9780918786364
- Altamira (Washington Writers Publishing House, 1987), ISBN 9780931846304
- The Travels of the Itinerant Freda Aharon, Watermark Press, 1985 (chapbook)
- The Science of Goodbyes (University of Georgia Press, 1982), ISBN 9780820306032
- From the Backyard of the Diaspora (Dryad Press, 1981), ISBN 9780931848407
- In The Basket of the Blind (Cherry Valley Editions, 1975)

== Awards ==
- 1977: National Jewish Book Award in the English Poetry category for From the Backyard of the Diaspora
