= FC Internazionale Milano (basketball) =

Italian defunct basketball club

F.C. Internazionale Milano, commonly referred to as Internazionale or simply Inter, and colloquially known as Inter Milan outside of Italy, has been one of Italian men's basketball team in the city of Milan, the section of the most popular football club with the same name.

== History ==
Inter took part in the first championships organized by the Italian Federation of Basketball (FIP), headed by president and founder of Arrigo Muggiani federation. Inter won the Italian league title in 1923 and did not receive other prestigious results. The club was disbanded at the end of the 1920s.

The winning squad of the fourth italian championship in 1923 was composed of: Vito Baccarini, Gustave Laporte, Manzotti, Arrigo Muggiani (captain and coach), Marco Muggiani and Giuseppe Sessa .

Arrigo Muggiani later became President of the Italian Basketball Federation; his brother Marco was the first coach of the national team.

== Honours ==
- Italian League

Winners (1): 1923
