= S.E.F. Costanza =

Società di Educazione Fisica Costanza (Physical Education Club Costanza) was an Italian amateur men's basketball club from Milan. Because of the fragmentary nature of the sources on the early years of Italian basketball, the figure of this society has often been confused with that of the Società Ginnastica Forza e Costanza (Gymnastics Club Strength and Costanza) of Brescia, winner of the Venice gymnastic competition which was held the same year of the first basketball championship.

== History ==
The S.E.F. Costanza was founded in 1919 and dissolved in 1935. It is unclear whether the name Costanza resulting from the playing field in the homonymous street in Milan, where played Borletti Milano until the mid-forties.

Costanza is remembered for winning the first official Italian basketball league, which took place in 1920. The quintet owner was Carlo Andreoli (player-coach), Angelo Bagnato, Polygon Longoni, Evezio Perabò and Angelo Vitali. In 1922 it was included in Group A of the championship lost to Assi Milano. Later, the Milanese was vice-champion of Italy in 1928 behind Ginnastica Roma, and then disappeared.

Some argue that Constance could be the progenitor of the OND Borletti (which later merged with Triestina Milan) and then won the league title in 1920 be attributed to the heritage Olimpia, direct descendant of the Milanese team.

== Honours and achievements ==
Italian League

- Winners (1): 1920
- Runners-up (2): 1922, 1928
