= WordTech Communications =

Poetry publisher based in United States

WordTech Communications LLC is one of the largest poetry publishers in the United States, producing nearly 50 titles per year. The press is owned and operated by Lori Jareo and Kevin Walzer. Some of their more notable authors are Ravi Shankar (poet), Philip Dacey, Rachel Hadas, J. E. Pitts, Jacqueline Kolosov, Rhina Espaillat, Annie Finch, Pamela Harrison, Penelope Schott, Ingrid Wendt, Nick Carbo, Allison Joseph, James Reiss, and Carol Jennings.

Wordtech, based in Cincinnati, Ohio, uses several imprints to disseminate its works: WordTech Editions, Cherry Grove Collections, Word Press, Turning Point, CustomWords and David Robert Books. Wordtech uses print-on-demand technology to print and distribute its titles, which gives the press more flexibility in regard to storage and distribution of its books.

Walzer and Jareo founded WordTech Communications in 1998 as an editorial services company, specializing in copy editing and copy writing, but in 2000, began publishing poetry. They began using the book contest model, wherein contests fees defray costs of publication and prize monies. When their sales revenues outgrew their contest fee revenues, they discontinued their prize and fee system and relied on sales revenues to fund costs, beginning in 2004, a policy which is still current.
