= Jayne Pupek =

American poet

- Born: March 8, 1962; Shenandoah Valley, Virginia, U.S.
- Died: August 30, 2010 (aged 48); Maidens, Virginia, U.S.
- Occupation: Writer
- Known for: Poetry and fiction

Jayne Pupek (March 8, 1962 – August 30, 2010) was an American poet and fiction writer. She wrote and published two collections of poetry: The Livelihood of Crows (Mayapple Press, 2010) and Forms of Intercession (Mayapple Press, 2008), and one novel, Tomato Girl (Algonquin, 2008), which was called a "wrenching, stunning, and pitch-perfect novel that captures the best of Southern literature's finest storytelling colors" by Library Journal and "an absorbing, unsettling debut" by Publishers Weekly. Writing for the Courier-Journal, critic L. Elisabeth Beattie notes: "Jayne Pupek's first novel puts her among the ranks of Southern masters like McCullers and O'Connor" Pupek's work has appeared in numerous journals and anthologies, and has received multiple nominations for the Pushcart Prize. Tomato Girl was also published as an audio book by Recorded Books as part of their Southern Voices Audio Imprint.

== Publications (partial list) ==
=== Books ===
- The Livelihood of Crows (Mayapple Press, 2010) ISBN 978-0-932412-94-2
- Forms of Intercession (Mayapple Press, 2008) ISBN 978-0-932412-59-1
- Tomato Girl (Algonquin, 2008) ISBN 978-1-56512-472-1

=== Work included in anthologies ===
- "Tomboy" (Just Like a Girl:A Manifesta, GirlChild Press) ISBN 978-0-9779372-1-9
- "Some Days" (Beyond Forgetting: Poetry and Prose about Alzheimer’s Disease, Kent State University Press) ISBN 978-1-60635-007-2
- "The Awakening" (Afternoon Delight: Erotica for Couples, Cleis Press) ISBN 978-1-57344-341-8
- "In a Station of the Metro" (Sixty Stories of Sudden Sex, Cleis Press) ISBN 978-1-57344-331-9
- "20 Reason I'm Not Writing Today" and "The Xerox Girls" (Ectoplasmic Necropolis, Blood Pudding Press) (chapbook)

== Awards and honors ==
- "Letter to Eli," nominated for the Pushcart Prize
- "Ghost Child", nominated for Best of the Web 2007
- "Tomato Girl," listed on Overbooked's hotlist for New and Notable Fiction for 2008
