= Bridget Lowe =

American poet

Bridget Lowe is an American poet.

In an early interview, Lowe expressed her interest in and commitment to “figures who are rejected by the same social groups for which they are expected to perform.” The Poetry Foundation elaborates “Her poetry is accordingly concerned with those who feel they are both looked at and invisible, who are exploited yet remain deeply unknown.”

== Biography ==
Bridget Lowe was born in Kansas City, Missouri. She is the author of two collections of poetry with Carnegie Mellon University Press: At the Autopsy of Vaslav Nijinsky in 2013, followed by My Second Work in 2020. Her work has appeared in numerous publications including in The New Yorker, Poetry, New England Review, Ploughshares, The Southern Review, The New Republic, Parnassus, and the American Poetry Review, among others. Her work has also appeared in the Best American Poetry anthology.

== Awards ==
While a student at Syracuse University’s MFA program, Lowe was awarded a Discovery/Boston Review Prize from the 92NY (formerly the 92nd Street Y). In 2015, Lowe was awarded the Writer Magazine/Emily Dickinson Award from the Poetry Society of America. She is also a recipient of a fellowship to the Bread Loaf Writer’s Conference and a Rona Jaffee Foundation fellowship to MacDowell.

== Critical reception ==
Publishers Weekly, noted in its review of My Second Work that the "contemplative second collection from Lowe (At the Autopsy of Vaslav Nijinsky) blends stories of childhood and family with astute reveries and allegories, fusing the familiar and the strange and evoking the qualities of a modern parable." In an early feature on her work at Gwarlingo, Michelle Aldredge noted that Lowe's poems are "lyrics and elegies from material as disparate as science, history, and pop culture. The poems ... feel simultaneously contemporary and very 19th century."

In the Kenyon Review, Lucy Biederman wrote: "There is bravery in Lowe's focus on emotions besides love and hate, in the rigor and ruthlessness with which she describes, instead, disappointment, disgust, humiliation, and mild surprise ... The poems in this book go deep, beyond the beauty and the ugliness, as T.S. Eliot instructs, to 'the boredom, and the horror, and the glory.'"

In addition to Publishers Weekly, her work has also been reviewed in Green Mountains Review, 32 Poems, and The Collagist.

== Works ==
- At the Autopsy of Vaslav Nijinsky (Carnegie Mellon University Press, 2013)
- My Second Work (Carnegie Mellon University Press, 2020)
- "Waiting," The New Yorker, January 6, 2025
- "Advent," The New Yorker, December 25, 2017
- "The Understudy," The New Yorker, March 6, 2016
- "Rocksteady In Dimension X," Poetry, June 2015
- "Revival," Poetry, June 2015
