= Costanzo =

Costanzo is an Italian given name, translated from the Latin name Constantius. It is also used as an, originally patronymic, surname. It may refer to:

== People with the surname Costanzo ==
- Alessandra Costanzo, Italian electrical engineer
- Alfredo Costanzo (born 1943), Australian racing driver
- Angelo Costanzo (born 1976), Australian soccer player
- Blake Costanzo (born 1984), American football player
- Claudio Costanzo (born 1985), Italian footballer
- Filumena Costanzo (died 1923), Italian-Canadian bootlegger
- Francisco Costanzo (1912–?), Uruguayan boxer
- Franco Costanzo (born 1980), Argentine footballer
- Gerald Costanzo, American writer
- Jack Costanzo (1919–2018), American musician
- Jodine Costanzo
- Marc Costanzo (born 1972), Canadian guitarist and record producer
- Maurizio Costanzo (1938–2023), Italian television presenter
- Moreno Costanzo (born 1988), Swiss-Italian footballer
- Paulo Costanzo (born 1978), Canadian actor
- Robert Costanzo (born 1942), American actor
- Saverio Costanzo (born 1975), Italian film director
- Sharon Costanzo (born 1970), Canadian musical artist

== People with the given name Costanzo ==
- Costanzo Festa (died 1545), Italian composer
- Costanzo Porta (died 1601), Italian composer
- Costanzo Ciano (1876–1939), Italian naval officer
- Costanzo Preve (1943–2013), Italian philosopher
- Costanzo Varolio (1543–1575), Italian physician

== See also ==
- Constanzo
- Costanza (disambiguation)
- Francesco Costanzo Cattaneo (1602–1665), Italian painter
- Villar San Costanzo, a municipality in the Province of Cuneo, Italy
- San Costanzo may refer, in Italian, to any one of the numerous saints named Constantius
