= Mayapple Press =

Mayapple Press is a literary small press originally from Bay City, Michigan, but now based in Woodstock, New York. Founded by poet and translator Judith Kerman. Mayapple Press has produced more than 70 titles, primarily poetry by single authors, but also poetry anthologies, short fiction and Great Lakes nonfiction. Mayapple publishes poetry, fiction, and creative non-fiction. The Press has an interest in works that straddle conventional categories: Great Lakes/Northeastern U.S. literature, women, Caribbean, translations, science fiction poetry and recent immigrant experience. Publications are in both chapbook and trade paperback formats.

Award-winning authors have released books with Mayapple, including Brian Aldiss, Jeannine Hall Gailey, Howard Schwartz, and Allison Joseph. Mayapple Press authors also include Jayne Pupek, Conrad Hilberry, William Heyen, Penelope Schott, Myra Sklarew, Judith Minty, Eleanor Lerman, Mariela Griffor, Dennis Hinrichsen, David Lunde, Catherine Anderson, Jessica Goodfellow, Toni Ortner, Judith McCombs, Zilka Joseph, Johanny Vazquez Paz, Claire Keyes, and Nancy Botkin and Devon J. Moore.

In 2012, Mary Winegarden's poetry collection, The Translator's Sister, received an American Book Award from the Before Columbus Foundation. Kathryn Kirkpatrick's poetry collection, Out of the Garden, was a Finalist in the 2008 Southern Independent Booksellers Association Book Award. Paul Dickey's first full-length poetry title They Say This is How Death Came Into the World was published by Mayapple in 2011; in 2015, Dickey won the Nebraska Arts Council $5,000 Master Poet Award.

Mayapple Press is a member of CLMP (Council of Literary Magazines and Small Presses) and of AWP (Association of Writers & Writing Programs).
