= Penelope Schott =

American poet

Penelope Scambly Schott
- Writing career
- Subject: Poetry
- Notable awards: 2004 Turning Point Poetry Prize; Orphic Prize; New Jersey State Council on the Arts fellowship 2008 Oregon Book Award in poetry
- Literary movement: Feminism

Penelope Scambly Schott is a feminist poet and former professor of English at Raritan Valley Community College and Rutgers University. She has published several books of poetry and has taught poetry writing for Thomas Edison State College.

At Educational Testing Service in the 1980s she was part of the Guidance Research Group, which developed the SIGI PLUS career information system. Schott is a recipient of the 2004 Turning Point Poetry Prize, the Orphic Prize, and a fellowship from the New Jersey State Council on the Arts. She now resides in Portland, Oregon. She received the 2008 Oregon Book Award in poetry for "A Is for Anne: Mistress Hutchinson Disturbs the Commonwealth".

== Publications ==
- Imitatio Redux, Penelope Schott Starkey, College Composition and Communication, Vol. 25, No. 5 (Dec., 1974), pp. 435–437
- My grandparents were married for sixty-five years, Dept. of English, Fairleigh Dickinson University (1977), ISBN 0-930200-01-2
- A Little Ignorance, Clarkson N. Potter, Inc. (1986), ASIN: B000H5764G
- The Perfect Mother: Snake Nation Press, Incorporated (January 1994), ISBN 0-9638364-0-4
- Penelope: The Story of the Half-Scalped Woman : A Narrative Poem, University Press of Florida (December 1998), ISBN 0-8130-1639-8
- Almost Learning to Live in This World, published by Pudding House Press (2004)
- The Pest Maiden: A Story Of Lobotomy, WordTech Communications (December 31, 2004), ISBN 1-932339-47-7
- Baiting the Void, Dream Horse Press (September 30, 2005), ISBN 0-9659307-9-3
- A is for Anne: Mistress Hutchinson Disturbs the Commonwealth, Turning Point (2007), ISBN 978-1-933456-68-3
- Six Lips, Mayapple Press (2010), ISBN 978-0-932412-84-3
- Crow Mercies, CALYX Books (2010), ISBN 978-0-934971-11-9
- Lillie Was a Goddess, Lillie Was a Whore, Mayapple Press (2013) ISBN 978-1-936419-25-8
- Love Song for Dufur: Poems, Windfall Press (March 2013), ISBN 978-0-97003-02-52
- How I Became an Historian, WordTech Communications (July 29, 2016), ISBN 978-1-625490-95-7
- Sophia and Mister Walter Whitman, Poetry Box (April 2021), ISBN 978-1-948461-44-3

== See also ==
- Raritan Valley Community College
- Rutgers University
- New Jersey State Council on the Arts
- Educational Testing Service
- Poetry
- Feminism
- Mayapple Press
- CALYX, Inc.
