= Allison Joseph =

American poet, editor and professor (born 1967)

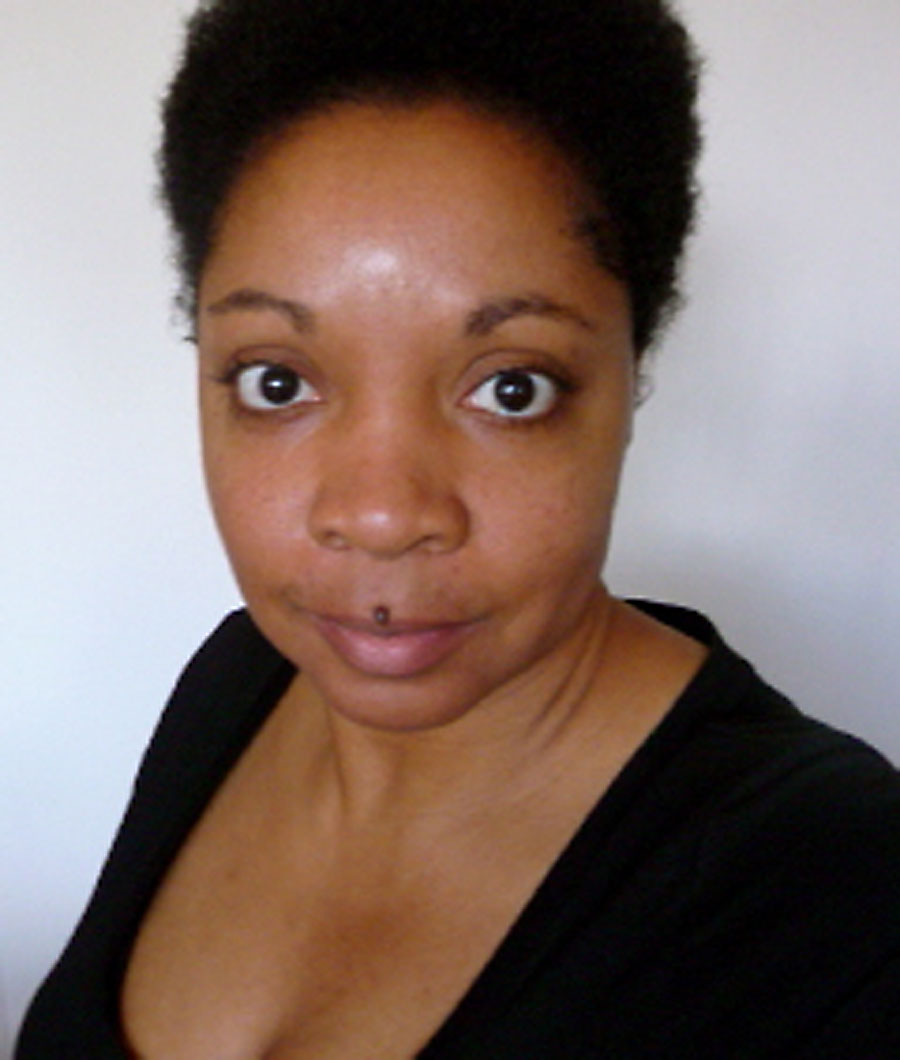
- Allison Joseph in 2008
- Born: 1967 (age 58–59); London, England
- Education: Kenyon College; Indiana University Bloomington
- Occupations: Poet, educator
- Website: www.nochairpress.com

Allison Joseph (born 1967) is an American poet, editor and professor. She is author of eight full-length poetry collections, most recently, Confessions of a Bare-Faced Woman (Red Hen Press, 2018).

== Biography ==
Born in London, England, to parents of Jamaican heritage, Allison Joseph grew up in Toronto, Ontario, Canada, and the Bronx, New York. She graduated from Kenyon College with a B.A., and from Indiana University Bloomington with a Master of Fine Arts. She teaches at Southern Illinois University Carbondale (SIUC), and is Director of the Young Writers Workshop at SIUC, which she founded in 1999: a four-day summer program for high school students. Many of SIUC's creative writing faculty and graduate students are involved with the workshop, and the student participants come from several states. In 1995, she was one of the founding editors of Crab Orchard Review as the magazine's poetry editor and has worked as editor-in-chief since August 2001. She is also the publisher and founder of No Chair Press. She lives in Carbondale, Illinois. Joseph will be teaching at the Poetry Seminar for The Frost Place in August 2021.

For more than thirty years, Joseph was married to fellow poet Jon Tribble, with whom she co-founded Crab Orchard Review. Tribble died in October 2019.

== Honors and awards ==
- 2020 Winner of the Independent Press Award, Small Book Category for Smart Pretender (Finishing Line Press, 2019)
- 1992 John C. Zacharis First Book Award
- 2009 Aquarius Press Legacy Award
- Literary Award from the Illinois Arts Council
- Breadloaf Writers' Conference Fellowship
- Sewanee Writers' Conference Fellowship
- Academy of American Poets prize
- Ruth Lilly Fellowship
- Associated Writing Programs Prize

== Published works ==
=== Full-length poetry collections ===
- Confessions of a Barefaced Woman. Red Hen Press. 2018. ISBN 978-1-59709-609-6.
- My Father's Kites: Poems. Steel Toe Books. 2010. ISBN 978-0-9824169-2-1.
- Voice: Poems. Mayapple Press. 2009. ISBN 978-0-932412-75-1.
- Imitation of life: poems. Carnegie Mellon University Press. 2003. ISBN 978-0-88748-386-8.
- Soul Train. Carnegie Mellon University Press. 1997. ISBN 978-0-88748-247-2.
- In Every Seam. University of Pittsburgh Press. 1997. ISBN 978-0-8229-3994-8.
- What Keeps Us Here. Ampersand. 1992. ISBN 978-0-935331-11-0.
- Worldly Pleasures. WordTech Communications. 2004. ISBN 978-1-932339-12-3.

=== Chapbook collections ===
- The Last Human Heart. Diode Editions, 2020. ISBN 978-1-939728-38-8.
- Smart Pretender. Finishing Line Press, 2019. ISBN 978-1635349603.
- Corporal Muse. Sibling Rivalry Press, 2018. ISBN 978-1-943977-50-5.

=== Anthology publications ===
- New Sister Voices: Poetry by American Women of African Descent
- Pamela Gemin; Paula Sergi, eds. (1999). Boomer Girls: poems by women from the baby boom generation. University of Iowa Press. ISBN 978-0-87745-687-2.
- Gerald Costanzo; Jim Daniels, eds. (2000). American Poetry: the next generation. Carnegie Mellon University Press. ISBN 978-0-88748-343-1.
