= Dorianne Laux =

American poet (born 1952)

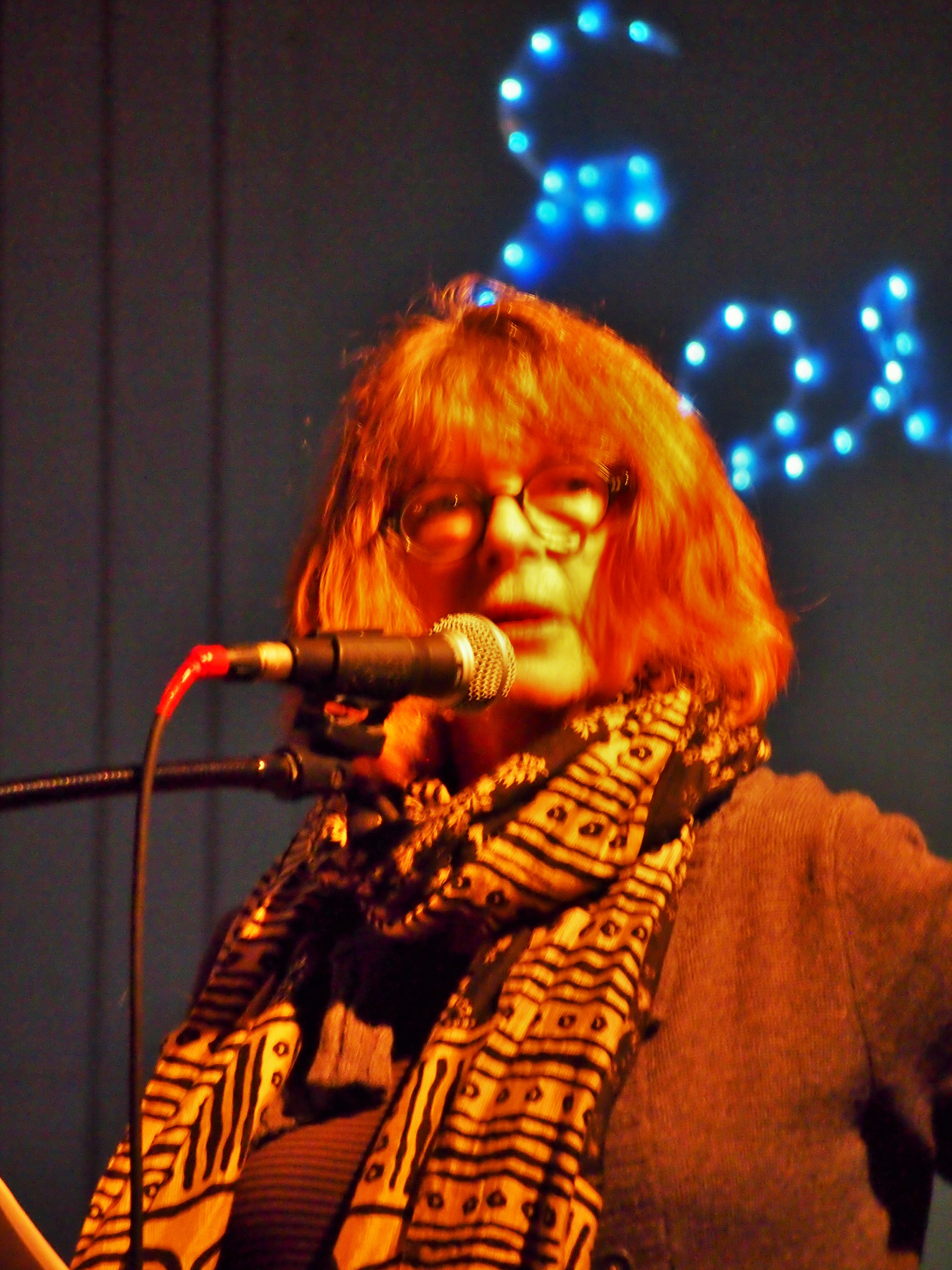
- Born: January 10, 1952 (age 74); Augusta, Maine
- Education: Mills College (BA)
- Occupations: Poet, professor
- Spouse: Joseph Millar
- Children: 1
- Writing career
- Notable works: The Book of Men (2011), Facts about the Moon (2005), What We Carry (1994)
- Website: doriannelaux.com

Dorianne Laux (born January 10, 1952, in Augusta, Maine) is an American poet.

== Biography ==
Laux worked as a sanatorium cook, a gas station manager, and a maid before receiving a B.A. in English from Mills College in 1988.

Laux taught at the University of Oregon. She is the director of North Carolina State University’s creative writing program, and is a professor at the MFA in Writing program at Pacific University. She is also a contributing editor at The Alaska Quarterly Review.

Her work has appeared in The American Poetry Review, The Kenyon Review, Ms., Orion, Ploughshares, The Southern Review, The Seattle Review, Tin House, TriQuarterly, Zyzzyva, and Gulf Coast. It has also been published in The Best of The American Poetry Review, The Norton Anthology of Modern and Contemporary Poetry, and The Best American Poetry 1999, 2006, 2013, and 2017.

Laux lives in Raleigh, North Carolina, with her husband, poet Joseph Millar. She has one daughter.

== Awards ==
- Pulitzer Prize finalist for Only As the Day is Long: New and Selected Poems
- Paterson Prize for The Book of Men
- Roanoke-Chowan Award for The Book of Men
- Pushcart Prize
- Two fellowships from the National Endowment for the Arts
- Guggenheim Fellowship
- Oregon Book Award for Facts about the Moon
- Lenore Marshall Poetry Prize shortlist for Facts about the Moon
- National Book Critics Circle Award finalist for What We Carry
- National Book Award for Poetry longlist for Life on Earth

== Works ==
- Awake. Introduced by Philip Levine. BOA Editions. 1990. ISBN 978-0-918526-76-2. Re-issued by Eastern Washington University Press.
- What We Carry. BOA Editions. 1994. ISBN 978-1-880238-07-3.
- Smoke. BOA Editions. 2000. ISBN 978-1-880238-86-8.
- Facts about the Moon. W. W. Norton & Company. 2005. ISBN 978-0-393-32962-9.
- Superman: The Chapbook. Red Dragonfly Press. 2008.
- Dark Charms. Red Dragonfly Press. 2010.
- The Book of Men: Poems. W. W. Norton. 2011. ISBN 978-0-393-07955-5.
- The Book of Women. Red Dragonfly Press. 2012 ISBN 9781937693046.
- Only As the Day Is Long: New and Selected Poems. W. W. Norton. 2019. ISBN 978-0393652338
- Life on Earth. W.W. Norton. 2024. ISBN 978-1-324-06582-1.

=== As co-author ===
- Addonizio, Kim; Laux, Dorianne (1997). The Poet's Companion: A Guide to the Pleasures of Writing Poetry. W.W. Norton. ISBN 978-0-393-31654-4.

=== As translator ===
- Cardona, Hélène (2014). Ce que nous portons [What we carry]. Translated by Laux, Dorianne. Paris: Éditions du Cygne. ISBN 978-2-84924-377-0.
