= Società Ginnastica Triestina =

Italian multisports club

Società Ginnastica Triestina (Gymnastics Club Triestina) is an amateur sports association from Trieste, Italy. The club was honored by CONI Stella d'oro Sporting Merit with a Gold Medal at the Ministry of Education for the school and another gold collar CONI for Sporting Merit.

The club supports football, gymnastics, fencing, volleyball, judo, various martial arts, ballet, modern dance, yoga and others.

== History ==
The club was founded in 1863. For more than a century, it has been the main supporter sports activities in the area, even across the borders of Friuli-Venezia Giulia. The club represented Italy at the 1936 Berlin Olympics; the Italian gymnastics team and the male basketball team was mostly made of Trieste team members.

Società Ginnastica Triestina's basketball section won ten championships, with both male and female teams each winning five first national divisions (women's Serie A1 and LEGA Basket Serie A). The women's basketball team disputes the A1 series.
