= Joseph Millar =

American writer

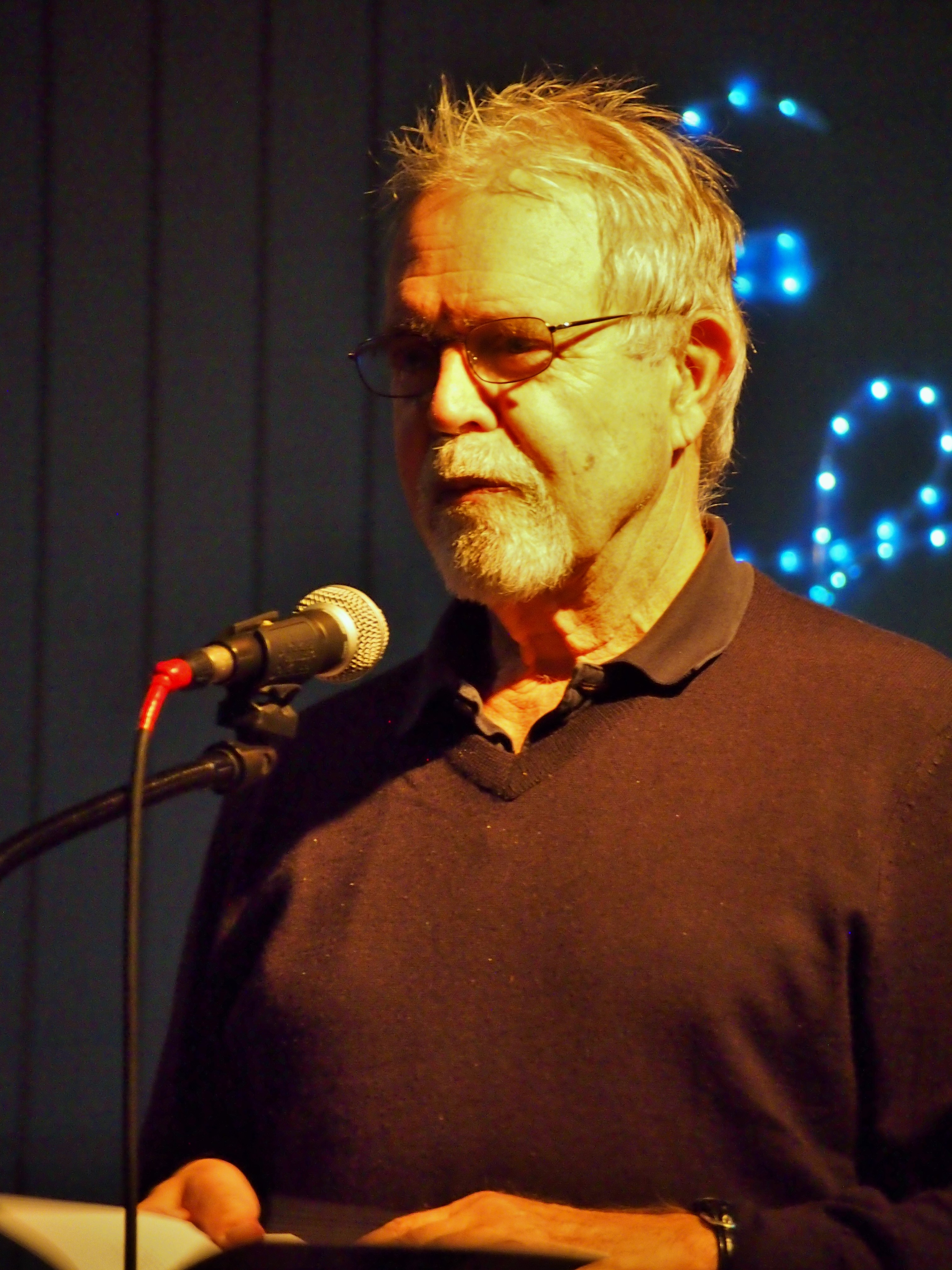
- Born: Joseph Hamilton Millar
- Citizenship: United States of America
- Education: Johns Hopkins University
- Occupation: Poet
- Spouse: Dorianne Laux
- Children: 4
- Writing career
- Genre: Poetry

Joseph Millar is an American poet. He was raised in western Pennsylvania and after an adult life spent mostly in the SF Bay Area and the Northwest, he divides his time between Raleigh, NC and Richmond, CA.

== Life ==
Millar received a BA degree from the University of Pennsylvania in 1967 and an MA degree from Johns Hopkins University in 1970. He has worked as a telephone installation foreman and commercial fisherman and in 1997 gave up this blue collar life to try his hand at teaching. He has poems about fatherhood, labor, relationships and the life of the American man in the 20th Century.

His work has appeared in many magazines and journals, including The Alaska Quarterly Review, "DoubleTake," Ploughshares, Poetry International, and Prairie Schooner, The Southern Review, TriQuarterly, New Letters, Raleigh Review and Shenandoah.

He has taught at Mount Hood Community College, Oregon State University. He now teaches in the MFA in Writing Program at Pacific University and the Esalen Institute.

He is married to poet Dorianne Laux; they divide their time between Raleigh, North Carolina and Richmond, CA.

== Awards ==
In 2002, Millar was awarded a Grant from the National Endowment for the Arts, and in 2008 his work won a Pushcart Prize. He has also been the recipient of grants from the Montalvo Center for the Arts and from Oregon Literary Arts. In 2012, he was selected as a Guggenheim Fellow.

== Works ==
- Overtime: Poems, Eastern Washington University Press, 2001, ISBN 9780910055741, a finalist for the Oregon Book Award,
- Fortune, Eastern Washington University Press, 2007, ISBN 9781597660266,
- Blue Rust, Carnegie Mellon University Press, 2012, ISBN 9780887485497.
- Kingdom, Carnegie Mellon University Press, 2017, ISBN 978-0887486210

chapbooks

- "Slow Dancer", Cherry Valley Editions, 1992,
- "Nightbound", Idaho Review Press, 2009
- "Bestiary," from Red Dragonfly Press, 2010.
