= Costanza Starace =

Italian Roman Catholic nun (1845–1921)

Blessed Maria Maddalena Starace OSM
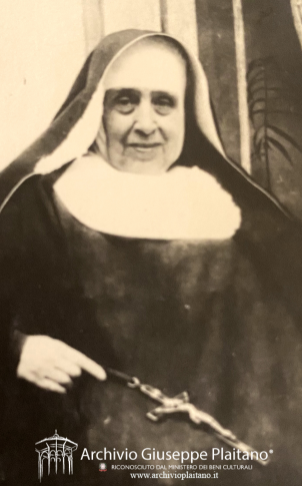

Virgin
- Born: 5 September 1845; Castellammare di Stabia, Naples, Kingdom of the Two Sicilies
- Died: 13 December 1921 (aged 76); Castellammare di Stabia, Naples, Kingdom of Italy
- Venerated in: Roman Catholic Church
- Beatified: 15 April 2007, Naples, Italy by Cardinal José Saraiva Martins
- Feast: 5 September
- Attributes: Nun's habit; Heart

Costanza Starace (5 September 1845 – 13 September 1921) was an Italian religious sister. She was the founder of the Congregation of the Compassionist Sisters Servants of Mary. Starace took the religious name Maria Maddalena of the Passion upon the occasion of her solemn profession.

Starace devoted her life to Jesus Christ and to the Mother of God in her mission to evangelize and provide relief to the ill - this was evident during a series of cholera outbreaks near Naples. She established her order to assist in proving relief and extending that service to the poor.

She was beatified on 15 April 2007.

== Life ==
Costanza Starace was born on 5 September 1845 to Francesco Starace and Maria Rosa Cascone as the first of six children. At her baptism she was consecrated to the Mother of God for protection.

As a child she attended a boarding school that the Daughters of Charity ran in Castellammare di Stabia. She was attracted to religious life and entered a convent at the age of twelve but was discharged and returned home at the age of fourteen due to her poor health. It was back at home that she enlisted the aid of a tutor who also helped her to start a regular life of reflection. As an adolescent she made efforts twice to enter religious life but was hampered with her health and thus she was required to return to her home; despite these attempts her parents objected. She became a Servite tertiary and made her final profession on 18 June 1867 in the name of "Maria Maddalena of the Passion". The Bishop of Casteallammare di Stabia Francesco Petagna placed her as the head of the Pious Union of the Daughters of Mary and part of her time involved teaching catechism to the youth.

Following a series of cholera outbreaks she decided to gather a group of women to help sufferers from the spread. It was at this point that she established the Compassionist Sisters Servants of Mary; the congregation received initial approval on 27 May 1871.

Starace died on 13 December 1921 of pneumonia. She was later re-interred in Scanzano on 19 August 1929.

== Beatification ==
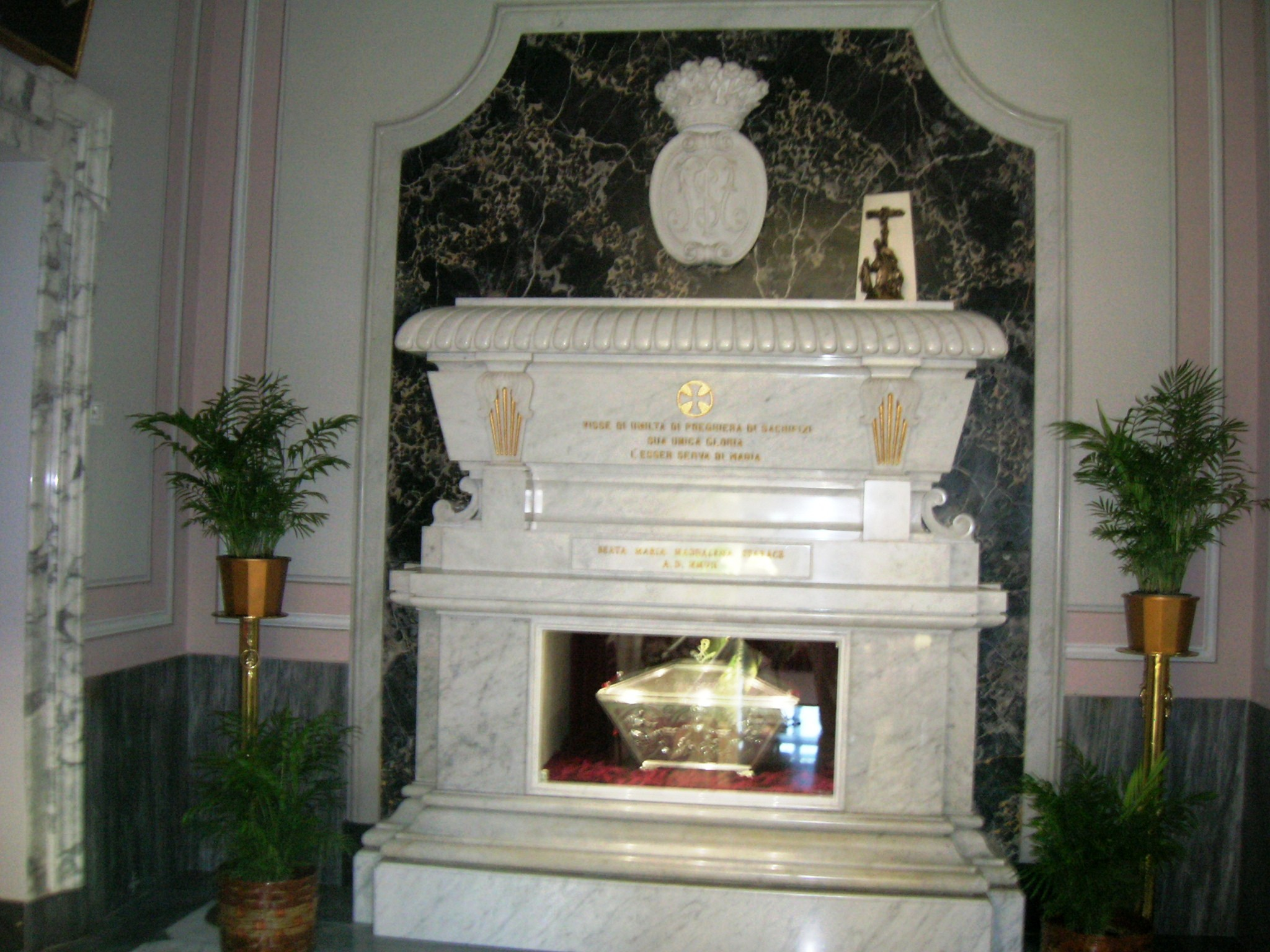
Tomb

The beatification process commenced on 4 April 1939 under Pope Pius XII and this granted her the title Servant of God. The process commenced on a local level in Castellammare di Stabia and the local process closed in 1942. It saw the accumulation of both documentation and witness testimonies and was granted formal ratification in 1993 - decades later - for the cause to proceed. The Positio was submitted to the Congregation for the Causes of Saints in Rome in 1995 for further evaluation.

Pope John Paul II proclaimed her to be Venerable on 7 July 2003 after he recognized that Starace had lived a life of heroic virtue.

The miracle required for her beatification was subjected to a diocesan tribunal and was ratified on 13 June 2003. Pope Benedict XVI approved the healing as a miracle on 26 June 2006 and allowed for her beatification to take place on 15 April 2007. Cardinal José Saraiva Martins - on behalf of the pope - presided over the beatification.
