= Alessandra Costanzo =

Italian electrical engineer

Alessandra Costanzo is an Italian electrical engineer specializing in microwave engineering, microwave circuits, and wireless power transfer. She is a professor at the University of Bologna.

== Education and career ==
Costanzo earned a laurea (master's degree) in electrical engineering, through a 5-year course of study, in 1987 at the University of Bologna. In 1989, through a national competition, she won a permanent research position at the University of Bologna, bypassing the need to earn a doctorate. She became an associate professor in the faculty of engineering there in 2001 and full professor in the Department of Electrical Energy and Information Engineering in 2018.

From 2015 to 2017 she chaired the Technical Committee on Wireless Power Transmission and Conversion of the IEEE Microwave Theory and Techniques Society.

== Recognition ==
In 2017, Costanzo became a distinguished lecturer of the IEEE Council on radio-frequency identification (CRFID). In 2022, Costanzo was named an IEEE Fellow "for contributions to nonlinear electromagnetic co-design of RF and microwave circuits".
