= Mario di Costanzo =

Mexican politician

- Born: 14 March 1962 (age 64); Mexico City, Mexico
- Education: Instituto Tecnológico Autónomo de México
- Occupations: Economist and politician
- Political party: PT

Mario Alberto di Costanzo Armenta (born 14 March 1962) is a Mexican economist and politician from the Labor Party (PT). In 2009–2012 he served as a federal deputy in the 60th Congress, representing the Federal District's 20th congressional district.
