= The Slowdown =

Radio show and podcast

The Slowdown is a radio show and podcast about poetry produced in collaboration between American Public Media, the Poetry Foundation, and the Library of Congress. The first two seasons of the show were hosted by Tracy K. Smith.

== Background ==
In each episode the host introduces and then reads a poem. The podcast is produced by American Public Radio, funded by the Poetry Foundation, and supported by the Library of Congress. The podcast debuted on November 26, 2018, and was later made available as a radio program on January 14, 2019. Episodes are released every weekday and are each about five minutes in length. The podcast is syndicated by radio stations in seven different cities including WEKU and WGTE-FM. Smith's idea for the podcast was inspired by a reading series she was doing called "American Conversations: Celebrating Poems in Rural Communities". She was travelling throughout the country for the reading series from 2017 to 2019. The first two seasons of the podcast were hosted by Tracy K. Smith. The third season was launched on September 21, 2021, and was hosted by Ada Limón. The show has featured politicians such as Anthony Scaramucci and Janet Napolitano. According to the National Endowment for the Arts, only 11.7% of adults read poetry in 2017 whereas young people are more likely to have read poetry because social media platforms such as Instagram have become a popular way of sharing poetry. The podcast was a finalist in the 2020 Discover Pods awards and was an honoree in the 2022 Webby Awards.
