= Gerald Costanzo =

American poet and publisher

Gerald Costanzo is an American poet and publisher.

Since 1970, Costanzo has been on the faculty of the creative writing program at Carnegie Mellon University in Pittsburgh, Pennsylvania. He has published more than three hundred poems, articles about poetry, and literary essays, as well as his own poetry collections and four edited anthologies.

He has been the recipient of National Endowment for the Arts Creative Writing Fellowships, Pushcart Prizes, a Pennsylvania Council on the Arts Writing Fellowship, and an Editorial Fellowship from the Coordinating Council of Literary Magazines.

He founded both Carnegie Mellon University Press (as Three Rivers Press in 1972) and Three Rivers Poetry Journal (in 1973). He has directed the Press, a leading publisher of contemporary poetry, for more than 35 years. Costanzo is a graduate of Harvard University and of The Writing Seminars at Johns Hopkins University.

== Works ==
- Badlands: First Poems, poetry (Denver: Copper Canyon Press, 1973)
- In the Aviary, poetry (Columbia: University of Missouri Press, 1974)
- Wage the Improbable Happiness, poetry (Cleveland: Bits Press, 1982)
- Three Rivers, Ten Years: An Anthology of Poems from Three Rivers Poetry Journal , poetry anthology (Pittsburgh: Carnegie Mellon University Press, 1983)
- Nobody Lives on Arthur Godfrey Boulevard, poetry (Brockport: BOA Editions, 1992)
- The Laps of the Bridesmaids , poetry (Cleveland: Bits Press, 1992)
- The Carnegie Mellon Anthology of Poetry, (co-editor), a poetry anthology (Pittsburgh: Carnegie Mellon University Press, 1993)
- The Devins Award Poetry anthology , poetry anthology (Columbia: University of Missouri Press, 1998)
- American Poetry: The Next Generation, (co-editor), a poetry anthology (Pittsburgh: Carnegie Mellon University Press, 2000)
- 12 Women: an Anthology of Poems, (co-editor), a poetry anthology (Pittsburgh: Carnegie Mellon University Press, 2014)
- Regular Haunts, poetry (Lincoln: University of Nebraska Press, 2018)

== Sources ==
Contemporary Authors Online. The Gale Group, 2003.
