= Assi S.S. Milano =

Assi Società Sportiva Milano (Aces Milan Sports Club) or simply Assi Milano was an Italian men's basketball club.

== History ==
As Arrigo Muggiani recalled, the club was founded in 1920 by students of "Horses and Conti" with the collaboration of the YMCA Milan basketball section. The Milanese team was a real star of the prehistory of the Italian Championship, winning six league titles in seven seasons between 1921 and 1927, before disappearing after the 1930 season.

The first championship was won in 1921: after beating Juvenilia, Comense and US Milanese in Group B qualifier, Assi also won the semifinal and final to the first 2 classified in the group A. In the six years following the "Aces" dominated, losing only the title in 1923, won from the Internationale Milano in the final against the very AXES. All season the coach on the field was Guido Brocca, which still is the second most successful coach of Italy in terms of league titles after Cesare Rubini.

== Honours ==
- Italian League

Winners (6): 1921, 1922, 1924, 1925, 1926, 1927
