= Constanzo Mangini =

Italian ice hockey player

- Born: 11 June 1918; Milan, Italy
- Died: 3 July 1981 (aged 63); Milan, Italy
- Position: Goaltender
- National team: Italy
- Playing career: 1935–1948

Constanzo Mangini (11 June 1918 – 3 July 1981) was an Italian ice hockey player. He competed in the men's tournament at the 1948 Winter Olympics.
