= Carnegie Mellon University Press =

American publisher

- Parent company: Carnegie Mellon University
- Founded: 1973
- Founder: Gerald Costanzo
- Country of origin: United States
- Headquarters location: Pittsburgh, Pennsylvania
- Distribution: Chicago Distribution Center
- Publication types: Books
- Official website: www.cmu.edu/universitypress/

Carnegie Mellon University Press is a publisher that is part of Carnegie Mellon University in Pittsburgh, Pennsylvania, United States. The press specializes in literary publishing, in particular, poetry. The press is currently a member of the Association of University Presses, to which it was admitted in 1991.

It is headquartered within the Dietrich College of Humanities and Social Sciences in Baker Hall and specializes in poetry. Gerald Costanzo is the founder and director of the publishing house. The press was established in 1972, initially under the name Three Rivers Press. Three Rivers published chapbooks and full-length poetry collections as well as Three Rivers Poetry Journal. The journal appeared semi-annually from 1972-1992.

== Publications ==
Notable book series published by the press include the following:

- Carnegie Mellon Poetry Series (authors who have published books in this series include Mary Ruefle, Cornelius Eady, C.D. Wright, Rebecca Morgan Frank, Allison Joseph, Laura Kasischke, Hayan Charara, Rachel Richardson, Brian Henry, Amy Beeder, Bridget Lowe, Nicky Beer, Kevin Prufer, and K.A. Hays)
- Carnegie Mellon Classic Contemporaries Series (reissuing of significant early books by important contemporary poets and writers of short fiction, including Pulitzer Prize winners in Poetry Carolyn Kizer, James Tate, and Philip Levine; and National Book Award in Poetry winners Philip Levine, James Tate, Gerald Stern, Jean Valentine, and Terrance Hayes, as well as works by Denis Johnson, Mary Karr, Larry Levis, Tim Seibles, Stuart Dybek, and Cyrus Cassells)
- Carnegie Mellon Series in Translation
- Carnegie Mellon Fiction Series
- Poets in Prose Series (titles have included texts in the form of poets writing about their writing lives, poetry criticism, and guidebooks and handbooks about the writing of poetry)

Following the closure of Eastern Washington University Press in 2010, Carnegie Mellon University Press acquired the EWUP's catalog.

== See also ==
- List of English-language book publishing companies
- List of university presses
