= Costanza Ghilini =

Italian artist (1754–1775)

Costanza Ghilini (1754–1775) was an Italian amateur painter.

Born in Alessandria, Ghilini was a member of the noble Provana di Collegno family; her parents may have been Vittorio Amedeo Ghilini, marchese di Maranzana and his wife, née Gabriella Maria Teresa dal Pozzo, but this is unconfirmed. She is recorded as having worked in pastel and oil, and to have been a fine performer on the mandolin as well. At her death she was memorialized in a sonnet by the poet Alessandro Sappa.
