= Hollywood (Bukowski novel) =

Novel by Charles Bukowski

- First edition cover
- Author: Charles Bukowski
- Language: English
- Genre: Autobiographical novel
- Publisher: Black Sparrow Press
- Publication date: 1989
- Publication place: United States
- Media type: Print
- Pages: 248
- Preceded by: Ham on Rye
- Followed by: Pulp

Hollywood is a 1989 novel by Charles Bukowski which fictionalizes his experiences writing the screenplay for the film Barfly and taking part in its tumultuous journey to the silver screen. It is narrated in the first person.

== Plot ==
Adopting the stylized alter-ego, Henry 'Hank' Chinaski, a character used in previous novels, this book relates his experiences of working with a director, finding financial backing, losing financial backing, writing the screenplay and finally completing the film, Barfly. The seemingly preposterous exchanges and occurrences within these pages leave the reader with the conviction that Hank Chinaski's life was truly stranger than fiction.

== Writing ==
The novel is a roman à clef, in which Bukowski is named Henry Chinaski, and his wife Linda is named Sarah. His friend, the poet John Thomas Idlet, is named John Galt. His German translator Carl Weissner is named Karl Vossner. Photographer Michael Montfort is named Michael Huntington. The film Barfly is named The Dance of Jim Beam. Film company Cannon is named Firepower. Bukowski uses the following names as pseudonyms for the people with whom he worked on the movie.

- Mickey Rourke, the lead actor in the film, is named Jack Bledsoe
- Faye Dunaway, the lead actress, is named Francine Bowers
- Barbet Schroeder, the director, is named Jon Pinchot.
- Idi Amin, the subject of Schroeder's earlier documentary film, is named Lido Mamin
- Menahem Golan, co-producer, is named Harry Friedman
- Yoram Globus, co-producer, is named Nate Fischman
- Robby Müller, cameraman, is named Hyans
- Éva Gárdos, the editor, is named Kay Bronstein
- Frank Stallone is named Lenny Fidelo

He also references people he met in Hollywood during his time working on the movie:

- Tom Jones is named Tab Jones
- Edward R. Pressman is named Harold Pheasant
- Dennis Hopper is named Mack Austin
- Sean Penn is named Tom Pell
- Madonna is named Ramona
- Norman Mailer is named Victor Norman
- David Lynch is named Manz Loeb
- Isabella Rossellini is named Rosalind Bonelli
- Werner Herzog is named Wenner Zergog
- Taylor Hackford is named Hector Blackford
- Roger Ebert is named Rick Talbot
- Jean-Luc Godard is named Jon-Luc Modard
- Timothy Leary is named Jim Serry
- Anton Corbijn is named Corbell Veeker
- Steve Baës is named Francois Racine
- Francis Ford Coppola is named Frances Ford Lopalla

== Filming ==
Though officially engaged only as screenplay writer, Bukowski appeared in the background of one scene, sitting at the bar with the other "barflies." Schroeder already had filmed a series of 52 short interviews with Bukowski, assembled under the title The Charles Bukowski Tapes. Footage later was used in a 2003 documentary on the author titled Bukowski: Born into This.
