= South of No North (short story collection) =

1973 short story collection by Charles Bukowski

- Front cover, first edition
- Author: Charles Bukowski
- Language: English
- Publication date: 1973

South of No North is a collection of short stories by Charles Bukowski, originally published in 1973 as South of No North: Stories of the Buried Life by John Martin's Black Sparrow Press. South of No North also is a play that debuted off-Broadway in 2000 based on nine stories from the book.

== Contents ==
The book is autobiographical, a collection of anecdotes and sketches with the central protagonist Chinaski often appearing. Some stories deal directly while others indirectly with Bukowski's life as a poet, writer, and beer drinking citizen. The book was dedicated to fellow poet friend, Ann Menebroker.

Among the short stories collected in the book are "Love for $17.50", about a man named Robert whose infatuation with a mannequin in a junk shop leads him first to buy it, then make love to it, and then eventually fall in love with "her," much to the consternation of his real-life girlfriend; "Maja Thurup", about a South American tribesman with an enormous penis who is brought to Los Angeles by the woman anthropologist who has "discovered" him and become his lover; and "The Devil is Hot", about an encounter with Old Nick at an amusement pier in Santa Monica, where Scratch himself is caged and on display, fed only peanut butter and dogfood, exploited by a cynical carnie.

The collection also features two of Bukowski's most famous short stories: "All the Assholes in the World Plus Mine", an autobiographical rumination on the treatment of his hemorrhoids, and "Confessions of a Man Insane Enough to Live With Beasts". (The latter story originally was published as a chapbook of 500 copies by Bensenville Mimeo Press in 1965.)

The short stories collected in the volume are evocative of Bukowski at his most successful, when he was one of the premier short story writers still at the top of his talent. The oddness of the subject matter can be explained by the fact that Bukowski's early lack of popularity in the U.S. meant that he wasn't being published in mainstream magazines. Instead, he was part of the "mimeograph revolution" in letters of the 1960s, appearing in mimeographed poetry magazines or chapbooks during the decade, including a magazine he himself published with Neeli Cherry, Laugh Literary and Man the Humping Guns from 1969 to 1971. To support himself, he contributed to men's magazines that were in the market for "dirty stories". The latter situation explains the presence of the soft-core pornographic story "Stop Staring at My Tits, Mister", an outrageous burlesque of cowboy fiction featuring a sex-mad wagon master named "Big Bart" obsessed with "Honeydew", the amply endowed wife of "The Kid". Big Bart's obsession with Honeydew leads to the inevitable show down with The Kid, with highly unpredictable results reflecting both Bukowski's misanthropic, cynical appreciation of the absurdities of real life. Like fellow 1970s cult artist-favorite Robert Altman in the media of film, Bukowski in fiction was able to subvert genre fiction with his acerbic world view.

South of No North was followed nearly a decade later by Bukowski's last collection solely devoted to short stories, Hot Water Music, but by then his power as a short story writer was waning. He later admitted that "the short story had deserted me", though he was able to occasionally generate a gem like No Wing High (collected in the 1990 poetry and short story collection Septuagenarian Stew) in his later years.

== Index of stories ==
- "Loneliness"
- "Bop Bop against That Curtain"
- "You and Your Beer and How Great You Are"
- "No Way to Paradise"
- "Politics"
- "Love for $17.50"
- "A Couple of Winos"
- "Maja Thurup"
- "The Killers"
- "A Man"
- "Class"
- "Stop Staring at My Tits, Mister"
- "Something About a Viet Cong Flag"
- "You Can't Write a Love Story"
- "Remember Pearl Harbor?"
- "Pittsburgh Phil and Co."
- "Dr. Nazi"
- "Christ on Roller Skates"
- "A Shipping Clerk with a Red Nose"
- "The Devil Was Hot"
- "Guts"
- "Hit Man"
- "This Is What Killed Dylan Thomas"
- "No Neck and Bad as Hell"
- "The Way the Dead Love"
- "All the Assholes in the World and Mine]]"
- "Confessions of a Man Insane Enough to Live with Beasts]]"

== The play ==
South of No North (Stories of the Buried Life) is a play adapted from nine of Bukowski's short stories by Leo Farley and Jonathan Powers, who also co-directed the play for New York, New York 29th Street Rep theatrical company. The individual stories are held together by the framing device of the character of Charles Bukowski (played by actor Stephen Payne) in the act of writing. Bukowski (Payne) comments on the stories, serves as narrator, and occasionally (as in the adaptation of Love for $17.50, which The New York Times review of September 25, 2000 called the "most notable" of the stories), enters the action.

The Times reviewer wrote that:

When he and his stories intersect, the results can be revealing, funny and surprisingly theatrical.... This Bukowski is no simple hero of the disenfranchised, and South of No North is most involving when it unfurls this rare psyche through such complex moments, when Bukowski keys into his pathetic characters with frightened identification and amused sympathy. Mr. Payne finds humor and pathos in the role.... Even his narration, with its languorous hold on words even as his sentences round to a close, suggests the writer's intoxication with the life of his mind. It is a rich performance.

Payne also played Bukowski's literary alter-ego, Henry Chinaski, a character of some of the story adaptations, which were more like vignettes. The Times reviewer notes that, "The appeal of these vignettes is spotty, and neither they nor the episodic structure offers much narrative and emotional drive".
