= Vexation =

Vexation(s) may refer to:

- Vexation and Venture, a conference format
- Vexations, an undated musical work by Erik Satie
- Vexations (poetry collection), a 2023 book by Annelyse Gelman

== See also ==
- Vexatious (disambiguation)
