= Ham on Rye =

Autobiographical novel by Charles Bukowski

- First edition cover
- Author: Charles Bukowski
- Language: English
- Genre: Autobiographical novel
- Publisher: Black Sparrow Books
- Publication date: September 1, 1982
- Publication place: United States
- Pages: 288
- ISBN: 0-87685-558-3
- OCLC: 8553358
- Dewey Decimal: 813.54
- LC Class: PS3552.U4
- Preceded by: Women
- Followed by: Hollywood

Ham on Rye is a 1982 semi-autobiographical novel by American author and poet Charles Bukowski. Written in the first person, the novel follows Henry Chinaski, Bukowski's thinly veiled alter ego, during his early years. Written in Bukowski's characteristically straightforward prose, the novel tells of his coming-of-age in Los Angeles during the Great Depression.

== Setting ==
Like his previous works, Ham on Rye is set in Los Angeles where the author grew up. Bukowski keeps his descriptions of his hometown grounded in reality, paying more attention to the people that make up Los Angeles than to the city itself. This type of description does not venerate or idealize the city, a contrast to other so-called "Los Angeles Novels". Scenes outside of Los Angeles show Chinaski as an intruder, as with an early scene where he and his family are chased out of an orange grove. The story takes place at home, at his different schools, at the doctor's office (for his never-ending acne treatments) and at various other locales around town.

== Plot ==
The novel focuses on the protagonist, Henry Chinaski, between the years of 1920 and 1941. It begins with Chinaski's early memories. As the story progresses the reader follows his life through the school years and into young adulthood. Chinaski relates that he has an abusive father, and his mother does nothing to stop his father's abuse. She is, in fact, a victim of her husband's brutality as well. Henry is not athletic but wants to be and therefore tries hard to improve. Football is difficult for him, but he enjoys the violence that comes with it. He has only slightly better results in baseball. As Chinaski progresses through grammar school, the focus of Henry's attention is on sports, violence, and girls. As Henry grinds his way through Junior High School, he discovers the manifold pleasures of alcohol and masturbation. As Henry begins High School, his father, who is experiencing downward inter-generational socioeconomic mobility, makes him go to a private school where he fits in even less amongst all the well-heeled, spoiled rich kids with their flashy, colorful, convertible sports cars and beautiful girlfriends. To make matters worse, Chinaski develops horrible acne so severe that he has to undergo painful, and mostly ineffective, treatments, essentially becoming a human guinea pig for various experiments thought up by his uninterested doctors. The reader eventually follows Chinaski to college and reads of Henry's attempt to find a worthwhile occupation.

== Protagonist ==
Like his previous autobiographical novels, Ham on Rye centers on the life of Henry Chinaski, this time during his childhood and teenage years. Throughout the course of the novel, Bukowski develops his misanthropic anti-hero character that is seen in his other works like Post Office and Hollywood. Chinaski, growing up poor in Los Angeles during the Great Depression, is shown developing into a sarcastic loner. This stems in large part from his home life, in which he is beaten frequently (often for no reason) by his father. He becomes alienated from the children at school simply for somehow being different in a way that none of them could ever coherently articulate. The post-facto rationalizations they concoct for their hostility, however, involve his inability to play sports and his being viscerally revolted by cruelty to animals, the latter being one of the favorite past-times of neighborhood men and boys alike. The grotesque-looking boils of his acne vulgaris will eventually turn their excuses for hating him into an ostracizing trifecta.

Chinaski has been compared to both Frankenstein's monster and Kafka's Gregor Samsa, because of his alienation and outcast resulting from his "monstrous" appearance. He often resorts to violence when confronted with those who alienate him, giving him a tough guy image to his peers. However, he rarely is completely confident with his own abilities and often second-guesses himself.

== Themes ==
As a prequel to Bukowski's previous novels, Ham on Rye depicts the origin and development of many of the reoccurring themes of his work as well as the persona of Henry Chinaski.

Some of the major themes:

- Relationships between parents, children, and economic circumstances. Henry’s father becomes increasingly abusive towards his son as the family sinks further into poverty.
- Disenfranchisement and the myth of the American Dream. As the young Chinaski witnesses the economic failure of his struggling family, he becomes increasingly disillusioned with the idea that success is based on personal merit and hard work.

This is encapsulated particularly in the opening to Chapter 44, in which Henry ruminates on the American Dream as a sham reality which his father believed in, but which he cannot. Instead, he sees through it:

I could see the road ahead of me. I was poor and I was going to stay poor. But I didn't particularly want money. I didn't know what I wanted. Yes, I did. I wanted someplace to hide out, someplace where one didn't have to do anything. The thought of being something didn't only appall me, it sickened me. The thought of being a lawyer or a councilman or an engineer, anything like that, seemed impossible to me. To get married, to have children, to get trapped in the family structure. To go someplace to work every day and to return. It was impossible. To do things, simple things, to be part of family picnics, Christmas, the 4th of July, Labor, Mother's Day . . . was a man born just to endure those things and then die? I would rather be a dishwasher, return alone to a tiny room and drink myself to sleep.

My father had a master plan. He told me, "My son, each man during his lifetime should buy a house. Finally he dies and leaves that house to his son. Then his son gets his own house and dies, leaves both houses to his son. That's two houses. That son gets his own house, that's three houses . . ."

The family structure. Victory over adversity through the family. He believed in it. Take the family, mix with God and Country, add the ten-hour day and you had what was needed.

I looked at my father, at his hands, his face, his eyebrows, and I knew that this man had nothing to do with me. He was a stranger. My mother was non-existent. I was cursed. Looking at my father I saw nothing but indecent dullness. Worse, he was even more afraid to fail than most others. Centuries of peasant blood and peasant training. The Chinaski bloodline had been thinned by a series of peasant-servants who had surrendered their real lives for fractional and illusionary gains. Not a man in line who said, "I don't want a house, I want a thousand houses, now!"

He had sent me to that rich high school hoping that the ruler's attitude would rub off on me as I watched the rich boys screech up in their cream-colored coupes and pick up the girls in bright dresses. Instead I learned that the poor usually stay poor. That the young rich smell the stink of the poor and learn to find it a bit amusing. They had to laugh, otherwise it would be too terrifying. They'd learned that, through the centuries. I would never forgive the girls for getting into those cream-colored coupes with the laughing boys. They couldn't help it, of course, yet you always think, maybe . . . But no, there weren't any maybes. Wealth meant victory and victory was the only reality.

What woman chooses to live with a dishwasher?

- The underlying superficiality of societal values. Henry notices a disconnect between society’s supposed values and his personal experience. Rather than a nation dedicated to freedom and equality, he finds a country based on the abuse of power (between himself and his father, teachers, stronger/wealthier students) and obsessed with appearance and displays of wealth, “A whole god-damned nation of assholes driving automobiles, eating, having babies, doing everything in the worst way possible, like voting for a presidential candidate who reminded them most of themselves.”
- The individual against the system. Henry finds himself in antagonistic relationships with the traditional representatives of societal norms - his father, school authorities, the wealthy. This is exampled in young Chinaski’s admiration for and regret over the death of John Dillinger - a Robin Hoodesque figure to the poor.
- The transformative power of literature. As Henry becomes older and increasingly isolated, he finds solace in the local library and immerses himself in fiction. Writers such as Dostoevsky, Gorky, Hemingway, Fante, and Thurber aid Henry in creating a framework for his own personal experiences, allowing him solace, escape, and a deeper understanding of life. Reading gives him inspiration and confidence to begin writing himself. Thus, Ham on Rye can be read as a Künstlerroman because it gives the reader a glimpse into the formation of the artist Bukowski would eventually become.

== The Chinaskis ==
Like Henry, the rest of the Chinaskis are modeled after Bukowski's own family. For example, Henry's parents, like Bukowski's, had met in Germany after World War I.

- Emily Chinaski: Chinaski's grandmother on his father’s side. The beginning of the novel starts with his earliest memory of his grandmother; she would proclaim “I will bury all of you!” Other than that, his best memory of visiting her home involves him and his parents leaving to go visit his grandfather, who does not live with Emily. Later, she appears with a crucifix to rid him of "the devil" causing his acne.
- Leonard Chinaski: Chinaski's grandfather, separated from Emily. Though Chinaski's father admonishes Leonard for being a drunk (his breath stinks of alcohol), Chinaski himself remembers Leonard as a beautiful man. When Chinaski meets him for the first time, he gives the boy a gold watch and a German Iron Cross.
- Henry Chinaski, Sr.: Chinaski's father. He met Henry's mother overseas in Germany, where Henry, Jr. was born. At the beginning of the novel, Henry, Sr. works as a milkman. He is a harsh, cruel man who physically and verbally abuses his son from a young age. He also physically abuses his wife, Katherine, particularly after she catches him cheating on her with a woman on his milk route. Henry, Sr. regards the rest of his family, particularly his brothers John and Ben, with disdain. He often disparages them for being alcoholics and womanizers, two traits his son would later develop. At the onset of the Great Depression, he loses his job but continues to spend the day driving around to appear to the neighbors as if he was still employed. His son gets more jaded to his abuse as time goes on, and the two become openly hostile towards each other by the end of the novel. Eventually, Henry, Sr. throws his son out of the house after finding Henry’s short stories.
- Katherine Chinaski: Chinaski's mother. A native German, she met and married Henry Jr.'s father in Germany post World War I. She is also called Katy. Katherine is a loving mother, though she is subjugated by Henry, Sr.’s abuse. Chinaski initially resents his mother for not saving him from his father’s wrath, but later comes to regard her as another victim like himself. Though often disappointed with how her son lives his life, she really loves him and often displays a confidence that he will better himself. Her love for her son is perhaps best shown when she warns him that his father found his stories. Like her son, she eventually calluses to Henry, Sr.’s abuse, shown in the novel by her disregard of his later tirades.
- Ben Chinaski: Chinaski's uncle. Ben is only present in chapter three, and Chinaski remembers him as “a very handsome man… he had dark eyes which glittered, were brilliant with glittering light.” Ben is 24 and lives in a sanitarium because he is dying of tuberculosis. Despite this, Henry Sr. treats Ben with open hostility, ridiculing him for his debauchery. Ben takes it in stride, paying more attention to his nephew and sister-in-law.
- Anna Chinaski: Chinaski's aunt through marriage to John Chinaski, Henry, Sr.’s brother. In chapter four, Anna appears as an abandoned wife with two children, all three on the brink of starvation. Her husband has been gone quite some time, leaving Anna and the children penniless. Henry Sr. mercilessly belittles his brother and makes light of Anna’s situation. He claims that John is wanted for rape (whether this is true or not is uncertain) and that he’ll come back “when he’s tired of the hens.” Like Ben, Anna treats Henry’s father coldly and pays more attention to Katherine, who brings her food for her children.

== Other characters ==
- Various Teachers: Mr. Hall, Mrs. Westphal, Mrs. Fretag, Wagner, Mr. Stanhope, Miss Gredis, etc.
- "Friends": Robert Becker, David (Another loner that attaches to him.), Lila Jane (His first romantic interest), Red, Chuck, Eddie, Gene, Frank, Jimmy, Baldy, etc.
