= Post Office (novel) =

1971 novel by Charles Bukowski

- First edition cover
- Author: Charles Bukowski
- Language: English
- Genre: Autobiographical novel
- Publisher: Black Sparrow Press
- Publication date: 1971
- Publication place: United States
- Media type: Print
- Pages: 208
- ISBN: 0-87685-086-7
- OCLC: 1031776074
- Dewey Decimal: 813.54
- LC Class: PS3552.U4
- Followed by: Factotum

Post Office is the first novel written by American writer Charles Bukowski, published in 1971. The book is an autobiographical memoir of Bukowski's years working at the United States Postal Service. The film rights to the novel were sold in the early 1970s, but a film has not been made thus far.

== Plot ==
In Los Angeles, California, down-and-out barfly Henry Chinaski becomes a substitute mail carrier; he quits for a while and lives on his winnings at the race track, then becomes a mail clerk. Chinaski drifts from place to place, surviving through booze and women, with his biting sense of humor and a cynical view of the world.

== Writing and publication ==
An autobiographical account of Bukowski's years working as a carrier and sorter for the United States Postal Service, the novel is "dedicated to nobody". Post Office introduces Bukowski's autobiographical anti-hero, Henry Chinaski. It covers the period of Bukowski's life from about 1952 to his resignation from the United States Postal Service three years later, to his return in 1958 and then to his final resignation in 1969. During this time, Chinaski/Bukowski worked as a mail carrier for a number of years. After a brief hiatus, in which he supported himself by gambling at horse races, he returned to the post office to work as a sorter.

The great love of Bukowski's life, Jane Cooney Baker ("Betty" in Post Office), was a widowed alcoholic, 11 years his senior, with an immense beer belly. She died in January 1962. She also served as the model for "Wanda" in the 1987 Bukowski-scripted film Barfly. Bukowski's first wife, Barbara Frye ("Joyce"), suffered a physical deformity – two vertebrae were missing from her neck, giving the impression that "she was permanently hunching her shoulders". After two years of marriage in the late 1950s, she filed for divorce, accusing him of "mental cruelty". In the novel, Joyce is portrayed as a wealthy nymphomaniac.

In December 1969, John Martin founded Black Sparrow Press in order to publish Bukowski's writing, offering him $100 per month for life on the condition that Bukowski would quit working for the post office and write full-time for Black Sparrow. Bukowski agreed; three weeks later, he had written Post Office.

== Film adaptation ==
The film rights to Post Office were sold to Taylor Hackford in the early 1970s, but a film version of the novel has yet to be made. Hackford directed a 1973 documentary about Bukowski, titled Bukowski.
