= Factotum (novel) =

1975 novel by Charles Bukowski

- First edition cover
- Author: Charles Bukowski
- Language: English
- Genre: Autobiographical
- Publisher: Black Sparrow Press
- Publication date: 1975
- Publication place: United States
- Media type: Print
- Pages: 208
- ISBN: 0-06184-241-9
- OCLC: 24473336
- Dewey Decimal: 813.54
- LC Class: PS3552.U4
- Preceded by: Post Office
- Followed by: Women

Factotum (1975) is a picaresque novel by American author Charles Bukowski. It is Bukowski’s second novel and a prequel to Post Office.

== Plot ==
Set in the 1940s, the plot follows Henry Chinaski, Bukowski's perpetually unemployed, alcoholic alter ego, who has been rejected from the World War II draft and makes his way from one menial job to the next (hence a factotum). After getting into a fight with his father, Chinaski drifts through the seedy city streets of lower-class Los Angeles and other American cities in search of a job that will not come between him and his first love: writing. Much of the novel is dedicated to describing various menial jobs that Chinaski temporarily holds during the USA’s WWII economic boom. Even though some of Chinaski's jobs and colleagues are described with great detail, they all eventually end with him either abruptly leaving or being fired.

He is consistently rejected by the only publishing house he respects but is driven to continue by the knowledge that he could do better than the authors they publish. Chinaski begins sleeping with fellow barfly Jan, a kindred spirit he meets while drowning his sorrows at a bar. When a brief stint as a bookie finds him abandoned by the only woman with whom he is able to relate, a fling with gold-digging floosie Laura finds him once again falling into a morose state of perpetual drunkenness and unemployment.

== Film adaptation ==
Factotum was adapted into a film of the same name in 2005, directed by Bent Hamer and starring Matt Dillon, Lili Taylor and Marisa Tomei.

== Release details ==
- Paperback – ISBN 978-0-87685-263-7, originally published in 1975 by Black Sparrow Books
