= Factotum (film) =

2005 film

- Theatrical release poster
- Directed by: Bent Hamer
- Written by: Bent Hamer; Jim Stark
- Based on: Factotum by Charles Bukowski
- Produced by: Bent Hamer; Jim Stark
- Starring: Matt Dillon; Lili Taylor; Marisa Tomei
- Cinematography: John Christian Rosenlund
- Edited by: Pal Gengenbach
- Music by: Kristin Asbjørnsen
- Production companies: Bulbul Films; Canal+ Celluloid Dreams; Factotum; MBP (Germany); Mikado Film; Network Movie Film- und Fernsehproduktion; Norsk Filmfond; Norsk Filmstudio; Norwegian Film Institute; Pandora Filmproduktion; SF Norge A/S; StarkSales Inc. ZDF/Arte
- Distributed by: IFC Films (US); Icon Entertainment International (UK)
- Release date: April 12, 2005 (Trondheim Kosmorama Film Festival)
- Running time: 94 minutes
- Countries: Norway; France; United States
- Language: English

Factotum is a 2005 French-Norwegian dark comedy-drama film co-written and directed by Bent Hamer, adapted from the 1975 novel of the same name by Charles Bukowski. It stars Matt Dillon as Bukowski's alter ego, Henry Chinaski. Although events in the book take place in Los Angeles in the 1940s, the film has a contemporary setting.

== Plot ==
Henry "Hank" Chinaski is working toward becoming a writer while struggling with alcoholism and holding various menial jobs. The film follows Chinaski as he works at, and gets fired from, various jobs, which include cleaning a massive sculpture, delivering ice, working at a pickle factory, and working at a bicycle supply warehouse. In the course of sampling the smorgasbord of short-lived occupations, he meets up with assorted eccentric, frequently alcoholic characters.

The first woman Chinaski meets in a bar becomes his most consistent companion throughout the film. Jan, like Chinaski, is an alcoholic. He moves in and becomes her lover and drinking partner. They co-exist comfortably in languid squalor until Chinaski becomes upset after an altercation where he beats up a wealthy man at the racing track who refuses to give up his seat. Initially polite, Chinaski assaults the man after Jan challenges his behavior. Soon after, Chinaski leaves Jan.

Unemployed again and scoring his next drink, Hank meets another female barfly, Laura, who feels sorry for Chinaski and helps him procure alcohol with the help of her wealthy "sugar daddy" Pierre, an eccentric older man. After a strange misadventure on Pierre's boat, Chinaski briefly returns to Jan, who is now working as a chambermaid at a hotel. A pivotal scene occurs with Jan after Chinaski discovers that he has caught a case of the "crabs" from her. Chinaski gains work but quickly loses his job after deciding to drink instead of completing cleaning a large statue.

Chinaski and Jan again break up after realizing their relationship has become boring and predictable and that they no longer really need each other. Jan moves in with the wealthy man who Chinaski had beat up at the track. By the film's end, Chinaski finds that he is most comfortable being alone with just his alcohol and his writing to keep him company. In the final scene Chinaski justifies his lifestyle. While drinking, and watching a topless pole dancer, he describes the costs, persistence needed, and rewards of writing. In voiceover he says, "If you're going to try, go all the way. Otherwise, don't even start. This could mean losing girlfriends, wives, relatives, and maybe even your mind ... You will be alone with the gods, and the nights will flame with fire. You will ride life straight to perfect laughter. It's the only good fight there is."

== Cast ==
- Matt Dillon as Henry Chinaski
- Lili Taylor as Jan
- Marisa Tomei as Laura
- Bruce Bohne as Gas Station Owner
- Adrienne Shelly as Jerry
- Fisher Stevens as Manny
- Karen Young as Grace
- Didier Flamand as Pierre
- Punnavith Koy as Actor

== Production ==
The film is principally a French-Norwegian co-production, although with an American cast. It was released in Norway in 2005 and distributed in the U.S. by IFC Films in 2006. It was released on DVD in the U.S. on 26 December 2006.

Bukowski's picaresque novel, also titled Factotum, was published in 1975. The book and the film both center on the character of Henry Chinaski, Bukowski's alter ego, who appears in much of his fiction. Although events in the book take place in Los Angeles in the 1940s, the film has a contemporary setting, and was shot in the twin cities of Minneapolis–Saint Paul, Minnesota, including the then-vacant Fairmont Hotel on Hennepin Avenue and Palmer's Bar on the West Bank.

== Critical reception ==
Factotum received mostly positive reviews from critics, holding a 74% rating on Rotten Tomatoes based on 119 reviews.

Writing for RogerEbert.com, Jim Emerson praised the performance of Lili Taylor, but did not believe Dillon to be "slovenly or bloated or stinky or dissipated enough" for the role of Chinaski. He also considered Minneapolis, where the film was shot, to be far too clean and tame compared to Bukowski's real life stomping grounds in the poor underbelly of Los Angeles. He deemed Factotum "unnecessary" after 1987's Barfly and rated it 2.5 stars out of 4.

== Bukowski's poems ==
The script also makes use of Bukowski's poems published in What Matters Is How Well You Walk Through the Fire and The Days Run Away Like Horses Over the Hill, and some of Bukowski's notebook entries published in The Captain Is Out to Lunch and the Sailors Have Taken Over the Ship. For example, Matt Dillon reads the poem "Roll the Dice" (from What Matters Is How Well You Walk Through the Fire) in a voiceover at the end of the film.

== Awards ==
- Nominee Best Director - Norwegian Academy Awards (Bent Hamer)
- Winner Best Director - Copenhagen International Film Festival (Bent Hamer)
- Winner Best Actress - Copenhagen International Film Festival (Lili Taylor)
- Winner Best Supporting Actress - San Diego Film Critics Society (Lili Taylor)
- Nominee Golden Spike - Valladolid International Film Festival (Bent Hamer)
