= Elizabeth A. McAlister =

American scholar and professor (born 1963)

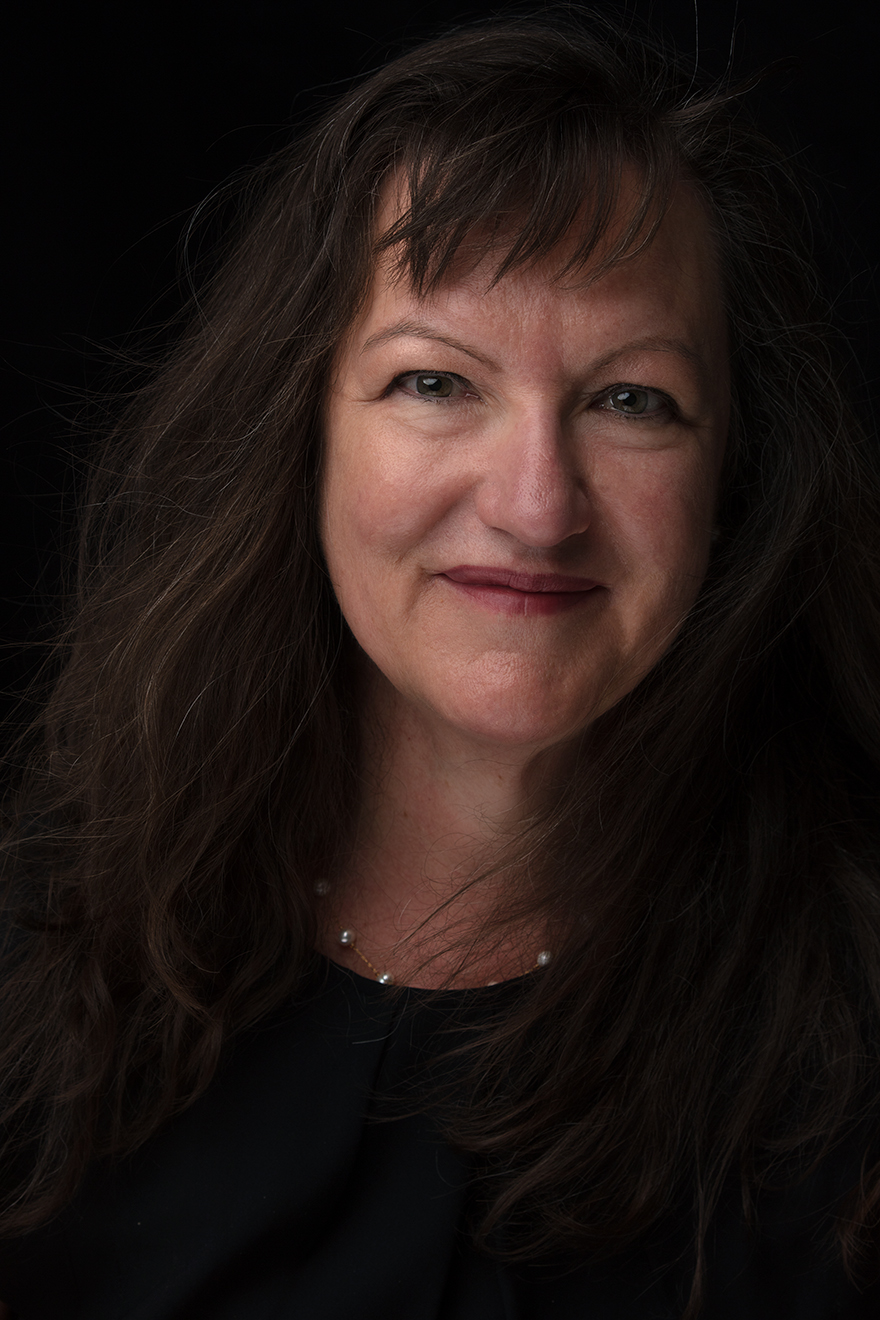
- Born: 1963 (age 62–63)
- Citizenship: American
- Employer: Wesleyan University
- Known for: Haitian Vodou; Afro-Caribbean religions; Pentecostalism; race theory; transnational migration; Caribbean musicology; evangelical spiritual warfare
- Awards: Binswanger Prize for Excellence in Teaching (2008)

Academic background
- Education: Vassar College (BA, 1985); Yale University (MA, 1990 & 1992; MPhil, 1993; PhD, 1995)

Academic work
- Institutions: Wesleyan University
- Notable works: Rara! Vodou, Power and Performance in Haiti and its Diaspora (2002); Race, Nation and Religion in the Americas (2004, co‑editor)

Elizabeth A. McAlister is a scholar of Religious Studies, and African-American studies, and feminist, gender, and sexuality Studies at Wesleyan University in Middletown, Connecticut. She is known for her contributions in Afro-Caribbean religions, Haitian Vodou, Pentecostalism, race theory, transnational migration, Caribbean musicology, and evangelical spiritual warfare.

== Education ==
McAlister earned a bachelor's degree from Vassar College, where she graduated summa cum laude in 1985. She then attended Yale University for graduate school, receiving an M.A. in African and Afro-American studies in 1990, an M.A. in history in 1992, an M.Phil. in 1993, and a Ph.D. in 1995.

== Career ==
McAlister is a professor of religion at Wesleyan University. She co‑wrote a CNN op‑ed with Millery Polyné of New York University about Haitian Vodou, describing how the faith supported people in slavery and played a role in the Haitian Revolution.

McAlister has written for "The Conversation" about Catholic views on demons and "spiritual warfare". She explained that some Catholics see abuse by priests as the work of demonic temptation, and noted the Church’s recent focus on "exorcism". She has also served as director of the Center for African American Studies at Wesleyan.

In 2008, McAlister received the Binswanger Prize for Excellence in Teaching at Wesleyan University.

In 2023 she was named a Crossroads Research Fellow at Princeton University, where she collaborated on building a digital archive of a Vodou temple in Port-au-Prince, called Espas Mikolan.

== Research ==
McAlister's first book and many articles focus on Afro-Caribbean religions, especially Haitian Vodou.

McAlister studied Rara festivals in Haiti, which led to her first book, "Rara! Vodou, Power and Performance in Haiti and its Diaspora" (University of California Press, 2002), showing how Rara bands use Vodou spirits and the dead to voice coded social and political views.

McAlister co-edited a scholarly volume arguing for the historical importance of religion in the racial formations of the Americas. She has also written a number of articles on American Christian Evangelicals, the New Apostolic Reformation and the Spiritual Warfare movement.

== Publications ==
=== Books ===
- McAlister, Elizabeth A. (2002). Rara! : Vodou, Power, and Performance in Haiti and Its Diaspora. Berkeley, CA: University of California Press. ISBN 978-0-520-92674-5.
- McAlister, Elizabeth; Goldschmidt, Henry (2004). Goldschmidt, Henry; McAlister, Elizabeth (eds.). Race, Nation and Religion in the Americas. New York and Oxford: Oxford University Press. ISBN 0-19-514918-1.

=== Interviews ===
- "Perspectives on Haiti's Earthquake" in The New York Times, January 2010.
- “Religious Rituals: A Wesleyan Teacher Debunks the Myths about Voodoo” in The New York Times, January 19, 2003.
- "Haitian Vodou Music and Ritual" in NPR: Fresh Air with Terry Gross, February 20, 1996.

=== Peer-reviewed articles and chapters ===
- "Necroscape and Diaspora: Making Ancestors in Haitian Vodou" in Timothy Landry, Eric Montgomery and Christian Vannier, eds., Spirit Service:Vodun and Vodou in the African Atlantic World. (Indiana University Press, 2022): 283–306.
- "Caribbean Women's Fugitive Speech Traditions" Women in French Studies Journal, Special conference issue, Dec 31, 2019: 25–35.
- "Race, Gender, and Christian Diaspora: New Pentecostal Intersectionalities and Haiti" in Judith Casselberry and Elizabeth A. Pritchard, eds., Spirit on the Move: Black Women and Pentecostalism in Africa and the Diaspora, Durham, NC: Duke University Press, 2019: 44–64.
- "The Militarization of Prayer in America: White and Native American Spiritual Warfare" Journal of Religious and Political Practice. 1: 1 (2016): 114–130.
- "Possessing the Land for Jesus", in Paul C. Johnson, ed., Spirited Things: The Work of "Possession" in Black Atlantic Religions (Chicago: University of Chicago Press, 2014): 177–205.
- "Soundscapes of Disaster and Humanitarianism: Survival Singing, Relief Telethons, and the Haiti Earthquake", Small Axe: A Caribbean Platform for Criticism 39 (Nov 2012): 22–38.
- "From Slave Revolt to a Blood Pact with Satan: The Evangelical Rewriting of Haitian History", Studies in Religion/Sciences Religieuses 41:2 (June 2012): 187–215.
- "Slaves, Cannibals, and Infected Hyper-Whites: The Race and Religion of Zombies", Anthropological Quarterly 85:2 (Spring 2012): 457–486.
- "Globalization and the Religious Production of Space", Journal for the Scientific Study of Religion 44:3 (Sept 2005): 249–255.
- "Love, Sex and Gender Embodied: The Spirits of Haitian Vodou" in Nancy Martin and Joseph Runzo, eds., Love, Gender and Sexuality in the World Religions (Oxford: Oxford Oneworld Press, 2000), 128–145.
- "The Madonna of 115th Street Revisited: Vodou and Haitian Catholicism in the Age of Transnationalism" in R. Stephen Warner, ed., Gatherings in Diaspora: Religious Communities and the New Immigration (Philadelphia: Temple University Press, 1998): 123–160.
- "A Sorcerer's Bottle: The Visual Art of Magic in Haiti" in Donald J. Cosentino, ed., Sacred Arts of Haitian Vodou (Los Angeles: UCLA Fowler Museum of Cultural History, 1995), 304–321

McAlister has also published numerous other articles, chapters, and interviews.

=== Albums ===
McAlister has produced three compilations of Afro-Haitian religious music: Rhythms of Rapture (Smithsonian Folkways, 1995), Angels in the Mirror, and the CD Rara that accompanies her first book.
