= Julie Amato =

Canadian voice actress

- Born: Julie Just; January 29, 1944; Lackawanna, New York
- Died: April 4, 2022 (aged 78); Palo Alto
- Occupation(s): Actress, Singer, Voice-over artist
- Partners: Dominic Joseph Amato, C.O. Lee Boyce Jr.

Julie Amato (née Just; January 29, 1944 – April 4, 2022) was a professional actress, singer, and voice-over artist.

== Early life ==
Amato was born to Thaddeus and Rose Just in Lackawanna, New York in 1944, the eldest of six siblings. She was afflicted with Guillane-Barre syndrome at the age of ten and was paralyzed for two years.

In 1961, Amato graduated high school and went on to study drama at Ithaca College. She also sang in local clubs, where she met her husband, musician Dominc Joseph Amato. The two married in 1965, after Julie's graduation, and had their first child in 1966.

Amato won the title of Miss New York State 1965. At the Miss America pageant, she was a non-finalist and won the talent award for popular singer.

The family emigrated to Canada as conscientious objectors to the Vietnam War.

== Career ==
In Canada, Amato established herself as a TV personality. She was featured on "Time for a Living," a CBC series with Alan Thicke, became a regular on "House of Pride," and appeared as a guest panelist on "This Is The Law." She also made guest appearances on "Rollin' On The River" and "Half The George Kirby Comedy Hour." Soon she landed herself a role as host of a variety show in the style of The Carol Burnette Show. "Julie," or "The Julie Show," ran for two seasons between 1976 and 1978. Season 1 ran on CTV on Tuesdays at 8:30pm. Season 2 ran on CTV on Fridays at 7:30pm. The change in time slots is thought to have attributed to the show's cancellation. Some notable guests on the show include Andy Griffith, Eartha Kitt, and Rip Taylor.

=== "Julie" (aka The Julie Show) ===
Season 1
Date	Guest(s)
21 Sep 1976	Liz Torres
28 Sep 1976	Paul Williams and Avery Schreiber
5 Oct 1976	Dick Shawn
12 Oct 1976	Frank Gorshin
19 Oct 1976	Morey Amsterdam
26 Oct 1976	-
2 Nov 1976	-
9 Nov 1976	Jimmie Walker
16 Nov 1976	-
23 Nov 1976	Eartha Kitt
30 Nov 1976	Paul Sand
7 Dec 1976	Diane Stapley
21 Dec 1976	-
28 Dec 1976	Paul Williams
4 Jan 1977	-
11 Jan 1977	George Savalas
18 Jan 1977	Georgia Engel
25 Jan 1977	Debralee Scott
1 Feb 1977	Frank Gorshin
8 Feb 1977	Andy Griffith
15 Feb 1977	-
22 Feb 1977	-
8 Mar 1977	Jaye P. Morgan
15 Mar 1977	-
22 Mar 1977	Patsy Gallant
5 Apr 1977	Phyllis Diller
12 Apr 1977	-
19 Apr 1977	-
26 Apr 1977	-
3 May 1977	Phyllis Diller
10 May 1977	-
17 May 1977	Paul Sand
24 May 1977	Ruth Buzzi
31 May 1977	Diane Stapley
7 Jun 1977	Kelly Monteith
14 Jun 1977	Marcia Wallace
21 Jun 1977	Debralee Scott
28 Jun 1977	Andy Griffith
5 Jul 1977	Georgina Engel
12 Jul 1977	Charlie Callas
19 Jul 1977	Robert Klein
26 Jul 1977	-
2 Aug 1977	-
9 Aug 1977	Patsy Gallant
16 Aug 1977	Morey Amsterdam
23 Aug 1977	-
30 Aug 1977	Phyllis Diller

Season 2
Date	Guest(s)
30 Sep 1977	Rip Taylor and Arte Johnson
7 Oct 1977	Chuck McCann and Clifton Davis
14 Oct 1977	Avery Schreiber and Rip Taylor
21 Oct 1977	Kelly Garrett and Chuck McCann
4 Nov 1977	Kelly Garrett and Clifton Davis
11 Nov 1977	-
18 Nov 1977	-
25 Nov 1977	-
2 Dec 1977	-
9 Dec 1977	-
16 Dec 1977	-
30 Dec 1977	Rip Taylor and Arte Johnson
6 Jan 1978	Patsy Gallant, Ted Zeigler, and Murray Langston
20 Jan 1978	Billy Crystal and Phyllis Diller
27 Jan 1978	Billy Crystal, Ted Zeigler, and Murray Langston
10 Feb 1978	Phyllis Diller and Dave Broadfoot
17 Feb 1978	-
24 Feb 1978	-
3 Mar 1978	Hagood Hardy, Steve Landesberg, and the Unknown Comic
24 Mar 1978	-
31 Mar 1978	Ruth Buzzi, Joan Allan Cameron, and Steve Landesberg
7 Apr 1978	Soupy Sales, Henny Youngman, and Diane Stapley
14 Apr 1978	-
21 Apr 1978	-
28 Apr 1978	-
5 May 1978	-
12 May 1978	Avery Schreiber and Rip Taylor
19 May 1978	-
26 May 1978	Clifton Davis
2 Jun 1978	Rita Moreno and Marilyn Michaels

Other guest appearances (unknown airdates): Jack Duffy, Billy Van, Bobby Vinton, George Goebbels

Following "The Julie Show," Amato became the spokesperson for White Westinghouse. She participated in several advertising campaigns: She was the voice of the National Geographic, the NBC, and narrated several “Celebrity Profiles” for the “E!” channel. Amato later became a successful voiceover coach.

=== The Ghost Dance ===
Although filming was done in the mid-1970s, "The Ghost Dance" was not released until 1982, following the premiere of the "Friday the 13th" franchise. In it, Amato plays Dr. Kay Foster.

== Later years ==
Amato met her later life partner, C.O. Lee Boyce Jr., at Mann’s Chinese Theater in November 1992.
