= Stratusfaction =

Stratusfaction may refer to:

- Stratusfaction (TV series), a 1973 Canadian music television program
- Stratusfaction, an instance of professional wrestling aerial techniques
