= Henry Chinaski =

Literary alter ego of Charles Bukowski

Henry Charles "Hank" Chinaski is the literary alter ego of the American writer Charles Bukowski, appearing in five of Bukowski's novels, a number of his short stories and poems, and the films Barfly and Factotum. Although much of Chinaski's biography is based on Bukowski's own life story, the Chinaski character is still a literary creation that is constructed with the veneer of what the writer Adam Kirsch calls "a pulp fiction hero." Works of fiction that feature the character include Confessions of a Man Insane Enough to Live With the Beasts (1965), Post Office (1971), South of No North (1973), Factotum (1975), Women (1978), Ham on Rye (1982), Hot Water Music (1983), Hollywood (1989), and Septuagenarian Stew (1990). He is also mentioned briefly in the beginning of Bukowski's last novel, Pulp (1994).

Chinaski is a writer who worked for years as a mail carrier. An alcoholic, womanizing misanthrope, he serves as both the protagonist and antihero of the novels in which he appears, which span from his poverty-stricken childhood to his middle age, in which he finds some small success as a screenwriter.

Some of the features of the Chinaskian persona: excessive alcohol consumption; love of art (classical music, literature); solitude and self-isolation; volatile relationships (especially with women); self-effacement; nihilism; and the violation of societal norms.

== In popular culture ==
Chinaski was portrayed by Mickey Rourke in the film Barfly (1987), which Bukowski himself wrote and by Matt Dillon in the film Factotum, released in 2005. In the Dutch short film De Blauwe Bus (The Blue Bus), which was released in 2009, he was portrayed by Jan Mulder. In 2015 he was portrayed by actor Jonathan Peacy in the short film Sitting on a Fire Escape Eating Eggs.

In 1997, the American rock quintet 311 (band) released the album Transistor. The album includes two secret tracks, one at the beginning and one at the end. The hidden track at the end of the album is called "Stealing Happy Hours," and it references the character in the lyrics, where it explains: "Don't wait one more minute to ask me/You make me feel like Hank Chinasky."

In 2013 the Argentine rock band Los Hijos de Claudia recorded a song called "Señor Chinasky", which refers to the character in the lyrics, where it states: "Mr. Chinasky, do not stop drinking".

The Avalanches used Henry Chinaski as a moniker to release "Sleepy Bedtime Mix for Young Ones" on the podcast Pinchy & Friends.

The character inspired the name of the long-running Czech rock band Chinaski.
