= Bukowski (film) =

1973 film by Taylor Hackford

- Directed by: Richard Davies
- Produced by: Alan Baker; Taylor Hackford
- Starring: Charles Bukowski; Linda King; Liza Williams; Lawrence Ferlinghetti; Joe Krysiak; Harold Norse
- Cinematography: Richard Davies; Barry Nye
- Edited by: Richard Davies
- Music by: Thomas Buffum
- Release date: 1973
- Running time: 46 minutes
- Country: United States
- Language: English

Bukowski is a 1973 documentary film produced by Taylor Hackford and directed by Richard Davies.

== Plot ==
Bukowski follows Los Angeles poet Charles Bukowski to San Francisco on 21 November 1973, for a poetry reading at City Lights Bookstore. The full 46-minute documentary begins with footage of Bukowski in his Los Angeles home and neighborhood as he discusses his history as a postal worker as well as his approach to and perspective on poetry. The film then shows him flying with Linda King to San Francisco for the poetry reading followed by interactions with attendees after the show. One night the window of his room is broken during a fight between some guests and then a fight between Charles and Linda causes her to leave. Interviews follow with Liza Williams (formerly Liz Lehrman) in Women as "Dee Dee Bronson", an Island Records executive (former Los Angeles Free Press writer), and Linda King about their relationships with Charles Bukowski. Bukowski is shown betting at the track and explaining his betting strategy.

== Production ==
The documentary was made for KCET. Taylor Hackford produced the documentary while working in the KCET mailroom.

On 14 September 1972, Charles Bukowski gave a reading at Telegraph Hill Neighborhood Center in San Francisco.

End credits thanks include:

- John Martin and The Black Sparrow Press
- Los Angeles Turf Club
- PSA Airlines
- City Lights Publishing

In 1973, Bukowski gave a reading at City Lights Poets Theater, referred to as "Poems & Insults!".

== Reception ==
"A cinema-verite portrait of Los Angeles poet Charles Bukowski. At age 53, Bukowski is enjoying his first major success (a San Francisco poetry reading nets him 400 dollars). Until 1969, Bukowski worked in the Post Office to support his writing, and the camera captures his reminiscences of those days as he walks around his Los Angeles neighborhood. Blunt language and a sly appreciation of his life form the core of the program, which includes observations by and about the women in his life" — TV guide, 25 November 1973.

== Release ==
On 25 November 1973, a forty-six minute cut of the sixty minute version premiered at the Los Angeles Municipal Art Gallery, Barnsdall Art Park, Los Angeles, California, and was broadcast the next day on KCET. On 16 February 1975, the film was shown in New York City, at the Whitney Museum of American Art.

A heavily-edited 28-minute version of the footage with alternate scenes and a rearranged structure was aired on PBS as an episode of the KCET series Artbound under the title Bukowski Reads Bukowski on Thursday, October 16, 1975, at 10:30 PM. This version contains less interview footage with Bukowski and his acquaintances but more footage of the reading itself. Bukowski: Born into This (2003) shows clips, and interviews director, Taylor Hackford.

== Recognition ==
- Los Angeles Corporation for Public Broadcasting's 1973 award for Best Cultural Program of the Year
- local Emmy Award nominee, Los Angeles area
- Silver Reel Award, 1973 San Francisco Film Festival

== See also ==
- List of American films of 1973
