= Women (Bukowski novel) =

1978 novel by Charles Bukowski

- First edition
- Author: Charles Bukowski
- Cover artist: Charles Bukowski
- Language: English
- Genre: Autobiographical novel
- Publisher: Black Sparrow Press
- Publication date: 1978
- Publication place: United States
- Pages: 291
- ISBN: 0-87685-391-2
- OCLC: 868173069
- Dewey Decimal: 813.54
- LC Class: PS3552.U4
- Preceded by: Factotum
- Followed by: Ham on Rye

Women is a 1978 novel written by Charles Bukowski, starring his semi-autobiographical character Henry Chinaski. In contrast to Factotum, Post Office and Ham on Rye, Women is centered on Chinaski's later life, as a celebrated poet and writer, not as a dead-end lowlife. It does, however, feature the same constant carousel of women with whom Chinaski only finds temporary fulfillment.

== Plot ==
=== Characters ===
==== Introduction ====
Women focuses on the many complications Chinaski faced with each new woman he encountered and had sexual relations with. When asked about his relationship to women, he said that they gave much more than he gave to the relationship, and this acts as a central foundation to the development of Chinaski as a character, especially in the beginning of the novel.

One of the first women featured in the book, who also recurred throughout the novel through random phonecalls and thoughts, is a character named Lydia Vance; she is based on Bukowski's one-time girlfriend, the sculptor and sometime poet Linda King. Chinaski's last face-to-face encounter with Lydia ended with her breaking into his house, destroying his paintings and books, and being arrested by police shortly afterwards; Chinaski refused to press charges, because Lydia had children she was struggling for custody for, and the charge would reflect negatively on that. But as soon as she was released, she called and threatened Chinaski again.

==== Women and More Women ====
After Lydia, there is an endless list of women that Chinaski goes through: Dee Dee (a successful Jewish music executive, "How the fatherland would've looked at us," he sarcastically sighed while with her), Tammie (an immature 20 year old woman and speed addict), Iris (an Indian-Canadian belly dancer met while giving a reading in Canada), Debra (a successful court documents company manager and paralegal), Laura (a Texas woman that Bukowski renamed "Katherine" because she looked like Katharine Hepburn), Sara (a health food nut who worked at a health food store), Cassie (rejected outright when Chinaski called and heard a man's voice respond), Tanya (a 23-year-old promiscuous mother, a 90-pound "tiny girl-child," and Chinaski's pen-pal), and Rochelle (the first and last woman he rejects in order to grow his final relationship, appearing only on the second to last page).

In fact, a number of characters are introduced by means of sending a letter to Chinaski admiring his work (usually with photo if successful) and wanting to meet him. A good number of other female characters (who are sexual with Chinaski) are friends or co-workers of his other partners or friends, such as Valerie, the girlfriend of his musician friend Bobby, and Tessie, one of the subordinate clerks of Debra. Several of Chinaski's sex acts in this work, including rape are vividly described.

==== Developing Guilt Complex ====
At first, Chinaski slowly realizes that he is not beneficial to the women he is with when some of them ask him questions about this. This latent theme grows and grows, and it becomes the final plot, which revolves around a developing guilt complex as Chinaski is increasingly made aware of both how he has hurt these women and ultimately how he has pushed good women away from himself by his behavior. In excuse, he says he does this because he was not loved enough as a child and that he was insufficiently intimate with women in his 20's and 30's, having married a sexless woman who was 35 when he himself was only 25.

This is in contrast to his other slowly-diminishing feeling, the shameless feeling that he was once a "lowly" postal worker, now was a "famous writer", and needed to celebrate this every instant with alcohol and many sexual partners, making up for lost time in his 20's and 30's. He mentions his former, postal co-workers, and how they would think of him, during a threesome with two women whose summed ages was less than his age.

=== Setting ===
Los Angeles is the backdrop to the work for the majority, except when he travels to New York, Canada, or elsewhere to give readings of his material. He constantly derides his own poor, unsafe neighborhood, the large amount of prostitution available (even when he is a client of these services), and the fact that "all American women wear pants." Political commentary on these conditions, though powerful, would only amount to a few paragraphs or few pages of the work.

=== Trivia ===
In the book, Chinaski's nickname is Hank, which was one of Bukowski's nicknames.

== History ==
Chinaski and Tanya had a weekend tryst. The real-life counterpart to this character wrote a self-published chapbook about the affair titled "Blowing My Hero" under the pseudonym Amber O'Neil. The washed-up folksinger "Dinky Summers" is based on Bob Lind.

== Cover art ==
Bukowski himself drew the picture of the woman on the cover of the book. During the work, he does mention traveling to Paris France to meet a woman and learn painting, which probably influenced this piece.

== Publication ==
The book was simultaneously published in Australia by Wild and Woolley, who bought a chunk of the first Black Sparrow Press print run.

== Adaptation ==
As of 1996, there was a planned film adaptation of Women that apparently never materialized. The writer, producer, and production designer Polly Platt adapted the screenplay. Another attempt to turn Bukowski's novel into a film emerged in the 2010s; James Franco, Don Jon, and Voltage Pictures have been working with a new version scripted by Ethan Furman. It is not clear (as of May 2019) whether this project is creatively connected to the '90s version, and whether the film will be completed and distributed.

== Influences ==
Throughout the novel, Chinaski is asked his favorite novelist many times. The first time he responds with Knut Hamsun, and later avers that he was deliberately misleading the questioner with a false answer, to see if the interviewer was smart enough to ask a followup (in which they failed). Elsewhere, he responds, "Fante." John Fante was a major influence on Bukowski. But at the end, Bukowski was able to recommend favorite authors at least four times, without finally concluding on any one as best of bests.

In 1980, he wrote the introduction for the reprint of Fante's 1939 novel Ask the Dust. Also in Californication, the lead character Hank Moody (Hank was the nickname of Bukowski) is inspired from the story.
