= Victor Mohica =

American actor (1933–2019)

- Born: Victor Mojica; July 31, 1933; New York City, New York, U.S.
- Died: October 17, 2019 (aged 86)
- Other name: Vic Mohica / Victor Mohica
- Occupation: Actor
- Years active: 1960-1993
- Spouse: Wanda Mojica (divorced)
- Children: 2

Victor Mohica (born Victor Mojica; July 31, 1933 – October 17, 2019) was an American actor. Though of Puerto Rican descent, he often portrayed Native Americans in his roles. His works include guest-star episode of Dark Shadows television series in 1969, featured actor in an episode of the Bearcats! television series in the fall of 1971, featured actor in the pilot episode of Ellery Queen television series in 1975, Cannon (2 episodes, 1973 - 1974), Little House on the Prairie Pilot Movie in 1974 and West Side Story Broadway version in 1968. His film credits include roles in Showdown (1973), Johnny Firecloud (1975), Victory at Entebbe (1976), Don't Answer the Phone (1980), The Final Countdown (1980), The Ghost Dance (1980) and Blood In Blood Out (1993).

== Filmography ==
- The Boy Who Stole a Million (1960) - Chico
- Harbor Lights (1963) - Cardinal's Man (uncredited)
- Operación Tiburón (1967)
- Together (1971)
- Banacek (1972) - Episode: "Detour to Nowhere" - Joe Hawk
- Showdown (1973) - Big Eye
- Little House on the Prairie (1975) - Soldat du Chene
- Johnny Firecloud (1975) - Johnny Firecloud
- The Abduction of Saint Anne (1975, ABC Movie of the Week) - Father Rubacava
- Victory at Entebbe (1976, TV movie) - Jaif
- Stunts Unlimited (1980, TV movie) - Joe Tallia
- Don't Answer the Phone (1980) - Ventura
- The Final Countdown (1980) - Black Cloud
- The Ghost Dance (1980) - Tom Eagle
- Diplomatic Immunity (1991) - Customs Officer
- Blackbelt (1992) - Emil Zolan
- Blood In Blood Out (1993) - Mano (final film role)
