= Martin & Meditations on the South Valley =

Martín & Meditations on the South Valley is a semiautobiographical poetry collection or "novel in verse" written by Jimmy Santiago Baca and published in 1987. Contents of the book include an introduction by Denise Levertov, (poetry editor at Mother Jones to whom Baca sent his early poems while in prison), Martín, an epic poem in nine parts, Meditations on the South Valley, a continuation of Martín in twenty-eight parts, and two glossaries of Spanish words, phrases, and references in English.

== Content ==
The content of Martín & Meditations on the South Valley draws largely from Baca's own life and experiences, though in her introduction, Denise Levertov warns against categorizing Baca as a "naive realist" and notes that Baca's poetry "manifests both an intense lyricism and that transformative vision which perceives the mythic and archetypal significance of life events". Both Martín and Meditations on the South Valley are written predominantly in the first person past tense.

=== Martín ===
Martín is a narrative poem, following the retrospective first-person reflections of narrator Martín as he searches for his identity within the context of his ethnic and parental background. Martín was abandoned by his parents as a boy, lived with his grandmother, and was sent to an orphanage from which he ran away at age 10. He lives as a drifter and explores the stories of his parents in VI & VII addressing both his mother and father directly through the use of the second person. Martín initially regains sight of his dream "to buy a house, / a small piece of land, / and marry a woman" but drifts from city to city, until finally remembering his dream again, returning then to his hometown of Burque where he falls in love with a woman, Gabriela, and builds a home for them in the South Barrio. In the final poem of Martín, Gabriela gives birth to a son, Pablo, whom Martín promises never to abandon as was done to him.

=== Meditations on the South Valley ===
Meditations on the South Valley begins where Martín left off, though it may also be considered an autonomous work. In the first poem, Martín's home and 10 years worth of his poetry are destroyed by fire and his family is forced to relocate to an apartment in the "Heights", a more affluent area than the South Barrio. While in the Heights, Martín expresses his frustration with living in an area which values "newness" over "age and durability" saying he "could not bear a life / with everything perfect". The difference between Martín and Meditations on the South Valley becomes more apparent when in IX of Meditations, the narrator shifts focus and begins to tell the stories of fellow Chicanos of the South Barrio. Though a few poems in Meditations on the South Valley seem to stray from Martín's main narrative, shown in Martín, the focus of these seemingly extra-narrative stories is always on life in the barrio. What this means, Levoto explains, is that while poems are autonomous from the narrative of the work as a whole, they "are never detached from that wholeness of view which results from an artist's dedicated engagement with experience". The collection closes by returning attention to the narrative of Martín as he rebuilds his house in the same place it had burned down. Baca uses the metaphor of the reconstructed house to illustrate Martín's persistence in rebuilding his life, in defining his identity, and in realizing his lifelong dream of familial love. Levertov calls the reconstruction "a miniature epic" and "Homeric".

== Reception ==
In 1989, Martín & Meditations on the South Valley was awarded the 1988 Before Columbus Foundation's American Book Award. Liam Rector in the Hudson Review has called Martín & Meditations on the South Valley "a powerful orchestration and revision of a narrative and lyrical admixture...with an utterly compelling dramatic form fueling the entire vivisection and the pilgrim's progress which makes it so much more than another 'collection of poems'".

The book was reviewed in the January/February 1990 issue of American Book Review.
