= Frank Salsedo =

American actor

- Born: Frank Sotonoma Salsedo; May 20, 1929; Santa Rosa, California, U.S.
- Died: July 3, 2009 (aged 80); Manteca, California, U.S.
- Other name: "Grey Wolf"
- Occupations: Actor / Acting coach & teacher
- Years active: 1975–2002
- Children: 4

Frank Sotonoma "Grey Wolf" Salsedo (May 20, 1929 – July 3, 2009) was a Native American actor. He was often cast in smaller parts centered on his Native American heritage.

As an actor, Salsedo has performed in movies such as The Ghost Dance, Magic in the Water (1995), Across the Great Divide (1976), Creepshow 2 (1987), Journey to Spirit Island (1988) and Best of the Best 2 (1993). He had a recurring role as White Eagle in Walker, Texas Ranger.

== Early life and education ==
Frank Sotonoma Salsedo was born on May 20, 1929, in Santa Rosa, California, to Gilbert and Helen Salsedo. He had five brothers (Delano, Lovedale Richard, Gilbert, Hal and Kenny) and six sisters (Helen Rose, Jane, Lola, Gertrude, Vera and Donna). He graduated from the Sherman Institute and then enlisted in the United States Navy. After his discharge he became a CPA and graduated from Sawyer's Business College.

== Career ==
Salsedo was the President of Jay Silverheels Acting School in Los Angeles, where he found his dream job as an actor. As a member of the Screen Actors Guild he made over 50 movies and helped other Native Americans in the film industry.

He portrayed the role of White Bird in the 1975 television movie, I Will Fight No More Forever. Salsedo appeared in one episode of the short-lived 1977 series, Code R. One of his earliest roles in film was as Ocacio in The Ghost Dance (1980).

Salsedo played Charlie in Best of the Best 2 (1993). In 1995, Salsedo played Uncle Kipper in Magic in the Water. The next year, he portrayed Nakki in North Star (1996), opposite James Caan. In 1998, he appeared alongside Chris Farley and Matthew Perry in Almost Heroes. He appeared in six episodes of Walker, Texas Ranger.

== Personal life and death ==
Salsedo was the hereditary chief of the Wappo tribe of Sonoma County, California. At the time of his death, Salsedo, along with the Mishewal Wappo Tribe, was involved in a federal recognition lawsuit.

Salsedo was married to Leta Stephens and they had two daughters, Lynette and Eugenia, and two sons, Ramon and Rick. He was preceded in death by his parents, his brother Delano, his sister Helen Rose Hageman and his wife.

In addition to his alias, "Grey Wolf", Salsedo also had an additional nickname, "Beverly Hills".

Salsedo died on July 3, 2009, in Manteca, California, at the age of 80. He was survived by five sisters, four brothers, and four children.

== Filmography ==
=== Film ===
Year	Title	Role	Notes
1976	Across the Great Divide	Mosa	Credited as Frank F. Salsedo
1979	Star Trek: The Motion Picture	Enterprise Crewmember	Uncredited
1980	The Ghost Dance	Ocacio	US video box title was Ghost Dance
1985	When Nature Calls	Gray Wolf	aka The Outdoorsters
1987	Creepshow 2	Ben Whitemoon	Segment :"Old Chief Wood'nhead"
1988	Journey to Spirit Island	Hoots	
1993	Best of the Best 2	Charlie	
1994	Windrunner	Huck's Father	Voice
1994	Wolfridge		
1995	A Boy Called Hate	Ted	Credited as Frank Sotonoma Salsedo
1995	Magic in the Water	Uncle Kipper	
1996	North Star	Nakki	
1998	Almost Heroes	Old Indian	
1999	Grizzly Adams and the Legend of Dark Mountain	Silver Bear	

=== Television ===
Year	Film/Series	Role	Notes
1975	I Will Fight No More Forever	White Bird	
1976	The Quest	Indian Chief	Episode: "The Longest Drive"
1977	Code R	Willie	Episode 1-1
1979	CBS Afternoon Playhouse	Joey and Redhawk	Credited as Frank Sotonoma Salsedo
1979	Centennial	Sam Lopez	Episode: "The Scream of Eagles"
1982	House Calls		Episode: "It Ain't Necessary to Sew"
1982	The Legend of Walks Far Woman	Many Scalps	Made-for-TV movie
1983	Buffalo Bill		Episode: "Buffalo Bill and the Movies"
1984	The Mystic Warrior	Sinte	Made-for-TV movie
1990	Northern Exposure	Uncle Anku	Episode: "Brains, Know-How and Native Intelligence"
1990	Quantum Leap	Grandfather: Mr. Washakee (Kinu)	Episode: "Freedom, November 22, 1970"
1990	Montana	Joe Hold His Gun	Television film
1993	Northern Exposure	Uncle Anku	Episode: "Love's Labour Mislaid"
1993	Picket Fences	Chippewa chief, "Bill"	Episode: "Rights of Passage"
1995–2001	Walker, Texas Ranger	White Eagle	Various episodes
1996	Mighty Morphin Alien Rangers	True of Heart	Episode: "Sowing the Seas of Evil"
1996	Power Rangers Zeo	Sam Trueheart	4 episodes
1998	JAG	Johnny Blackhorse	Episode: "The Return of Jimmy Blackhorse"
