= Teenage Father =

1978 film

- Main title
- Directed by: Taylor Hackford
- Written by: Taylor Hackford; Bud Freeman
- Produced by: Charlotte De Armond; Taylor Hackford
- Starring: Timothy Wead; Suzanne Crough
- Edited by: Sally Coryn
- Distributed by: Children's Home Society of California; New Visions Inc
- Release date: 1978
- Running time: 25 minutes
- Country: United States
- Language: English

Teenage Father is a 1978 American short film directed by Taylor Hackford and starring Timothy Wead. In 1979, it won an Oscar for Best Short Subject at the 51st Academy Awards.

== Plot ==
Filmed as a pseudo-documentary, the film follows 17-year-old John Travis and 15-year-old Kim in the last few months of her pregnancy. The documentary filmmakers interview the couple as well as their friends and family about their perspectives on the matter. John is interested in adoption but Kim is more interested in keeping her child. In the final scene of the film the child has been born and John views his son in the nursery but by that point Kim is no longer speaking to him and does not let him visit her in her room, leaving John distraught about the future.

== Cast ==
- Tim Wead as John
- Suzanne Crough as Kim
- Ken Sansom as John's Father
- Lette Rehnolds as John's Mother
- Jeannie Dimter Barton Kim's Mother
- Gary Mathew as Skip
- Paul Wolff as Denny
- Roland Meza as Roland
- Wesley Thompson as Charlie
- Denise Davis as Wanda
- Devin Buchanan as Devin
- Susan Cronkite as Social Worker

== Production ==
The film was a public education film from Children's Home Society of California. Susan Cronkite, who plays the social worker in the film, was an actual social worker for Children's Home Society at the time of filming.
