= The Ghost Dance (film) =

1982 American Western slasher film

- VHS artwork
- Directed by: Peter F. Buffa
- Screenplay by: Peter F. Buffa; Robert Sutton
- Produced by: Robert Sutton
- Starring: Julie Amato; Victor Mohica; Frank Salsedo
- Cinematography: Fred Murphy
- Music by: Joseph Byrd
- Production companies: Ahrememess, Inc.
- Distributed by: Trans World Entertainment
- Release date: May 21, 1982
- Running time: 96 minutes
- Country: United States
- Language: English
- Budget: $1 million

The Ghost Dance is a 1982 American supernatural slasher film directed and co-written by Peter F. Buffa, and starring Julie Amato, Victor Mohica, Henry Bal, and Frank Salsedo. Its plot follows a Native American shaman who becomes possessed by an evil spirit that drives him to kill. It was the first ever slasher film to be based around and feature Native American characters.

== Plot ==
The spirit of a malevolent, long-dead shaman, Nahalla, is unearthed during an archeological dig in the Arizona desert. The dig is overseen by local archeologist and anthropology professor Dr. Kay Foster. Nahalla possesses Aranjo, a local Native American man, after Aranjo steals a Kachina doll from Nahalla's grave and performs a ritual with it. Through Aranjo, Nahalla begins exacting a murderous rampage. First, he causes a truck to roll into the archeological dig site, seriously injuring one of the workers.

Later, Aranjo infiltrates the local museum after hours, where he kills Carol and Rick Haley, both colleagues of Kay's. Aranjo begins to stalk Kay and her boyfriend, Tom Eagle, lurking outside her house one night. In research conducted by Kay and her peers, it is discovered that Nahalla, a shaman previously unidentified by the academics, arrived in the region in the 1890s with an Anglo wife whom he had kidnapped. Nahalla formed an offshoot cult from the Ghost Dance, which centered on the notion of a world soon to be inhabited only by Native Americans and their ancestors.

One night at the museum, Paul and Kay examine the mummified remains of Nahalla, which have been stored in a medical laboratory. After Kay leaves, she encounters Aranjo who appears in the darkness on a desert road. Terrified, she visits the local police station, but Tom believes she experienced a hallucination due to stress and her hectic work schedule.

Back at the museum, Paul continues researching Nahalla's history by reviewing historical compendiums, and identifies the woman he kidnapped as Melissa Stuart. Paul leaves Kay an urgent phone message and prepares to leave, but is confronted by the possessed Aranjo who stabs him to death. The next morning, Kay examines historical records in the university library and uncovers a photo of Melissa Stuart, to whom Kay bears a shocking resemblance.

Tom brings Kay to visit Ocacio, a local medicine man, hoping he can help them. Ocacio reluctantly agrees to assist, but says he needs to visit the dig site, which Kay and Tom arrange for the next morning. Back at the museum, Kay discovers Paul's corpse on the medical examination table beside Nahalla's, and is confronted by a knife-wielding, possessed Aranjo. Aranjo chases Kay through the museum before cornering her in the laboratory, where it becomes clear he does not want to hurt her—instead, he wishes to use her body as a vessel for Melissa's spirit. Aranjo adorns Kay with a mystical necklace, causing her to become possessed by Melissa.

Before dawn, Tom meets with Ocacio near the dig site. Tom retrieves the Kachini doll, which Ocacio uses in a ritual to control Aranjo. A possessed Kay stumbles on the scene and tries to stab Tom, but is knocked unconscious. Aranjo stabs Ocacio to death, just before Ocacio drops the Kachini doll on an open fire, causing Aranjo's body to spontaneously combust. Tom returns to the museum with Kay and douses Nahalla's mummified corpse in alcohol, but before he is able to strike a match, Kay reveals herself to still be possessed by Melissa. She looks at Tom menacingly and wields a scalpel.

== Cast ==
- Julie Amato as Dr. Kay Foster
- Victor Mohica as Thomas Eagle
- Henry Bal as Nahalla / Aranjo
- Frank Salsedo as Ocacio
- Felicia Leon as Rea
- Patricia Alice Albrecht as Carol
- Deloris Maaske as Lena
- James Andronica as Paul Michaels
- J. Christopher Senter as Rick Haley
- Henry Kendrick as Lieutenant DeLeo
- Frank Soto as Basowaya
- Don Shanks as Excavation Worker
- Quentin Sondergaard as Campus Guard

== Production ==
Principal photography of The Ghost Dance took place in Tucson, Arizona, on a budget of approximately $1 million. The project was developed by writer-director Peter F. Buffa and writer-producer Robert Sutton, both graduated from the University of Arizona. Buffa began drafting the screenplay as early as 1974.

== Release ==
The Ghost Dance was given a limited regional theatrical release in Tucson, Arizona on May 21, 1982.

=== Home media ===
The film was released for the first time on DVD by Mediabox on April 24, 2006.

In October 2024, Vinegar Syndrome released the film on Blu-ray for the first time.

== Reception ==
=== Critical response ===
Daryl Miller, reviewing the film for the Arizona Daily Star, called it a "heavily cliched movie that throws nearly every old horror movie scare tactic at its audiences, without adding any new ingredients," though he did praise the film's cinematography. Micheline Keating of the Tucson Citizen noted that the film's "acting and direction are adequate and rather exciting," giving the film a B-rating.

== Sources ==
- Lentz, Harris (2001). Science Fiction, Horror & Fantasy Film and Television Credits: Filmography. Jefferson, North Carolina: McFarland. p. 1133. ISBN 978-0-786-40942-6 – via Google Books.
- Hilger, Michael (2015). Native Americans in the Movies: Portrayals from Silent Films to the Present. New York City, New York: Rowman & Littlefield. ISBN 978-1-442-24002-5.
- Pitts, Michael R. (2013). Western Movies: A Guide to 5,105 Feature Films (2nd ed.). Jefferson, North Carolina: McFarland. ISBN 978-0-786-46372-5.
- Sykes, Brad (2018). Terror in the Desert: Dark Cinema of the American Southwest. Jefferson, North Carolina: McFarland. ISBN 978-1-476-63132-5.
