= J. C. Quinn =

American film, stage and television actor

- Quinn in Barfly, 1987
- Born: John James Quinn Jr. November 30, 1930; Philadelphia, Pennsylvania, U.S.
- Died: February 10, 2004 (aged 63); Juárez, Mexico
- Occupations: Film, stage and television actor
- Years active: 1977-2000

John James Quinn Jr. (November 30, 1940 – February 10, 2004) was an American film, stage and television actor. He was best known for playing Arliss "Sonny" Dawson in the 1989 film The Abyss.

== Life and career ==
Quinn was born in Philadelphia, Pennsylvania. He studied acting in New York, and performed on stage. He began his screen career in 1977, appearing in the film Hooch. In 1978, he appeared in the film On the Yard.

Later in his career, Quinn guest-starred in numerous television programs including Hill Street Blues, Cagney & Lacey, Quantum Leap, Knots Landing, Stingray, Miami Vice, Cheers and Dawson's Creek, and played the recurring role of Red Griswald in the HBO sitcom television series 1st & Ten. In 1987, he starred as Jim in the film Barfly, starring along with Mickey Rourke, Faye Dunaway, Alice Krige and Frank Stallone. In 1989, he played Arliss "Sonny" Dawson in the film The Abyss. He also appeared in films such as Getting Away with Murder, Turner & Hooch, C.H.U.D., Gross Anatomy, Heartbreak Ridge and Brubaker.

Quinn retired from acting in 2000, last appearing in the CBS comedy drama television series That's Life.

== Death ==
Quinn died in an automobile accident in Juárez on February 10, 2004, at the age of 63.
