= Johnny Firecloud =

- Theatrical release poster
- Directed by: William A. Castleman
- Screenplay by: Wilton Denmark
- Produced by: William A. Castleman; David F. Friedman; Peter B. Good; Anton Wickremasinghe
- Starring: Victor Mohica; Ralph Meeker; David Canary
- Cinematography: Peter B. Good
- Edited by: Neal Chastain
- Music by: William Loose
- Production companies: Twentieth Century-Fox; Firecloud Productions
- Distributed by: Entertainment Ventures, Inc.
- Release dates: July 25, 1975 (Albuquerque); November 5, 1975 (Los Angeles)
- Running time: 99 minutes
- Country: United States
- Language: English
- Box office: $1 million

Johnny Firecloud is a 1975 American exploitation horror thriller film directed by William Castleman and starring Victor Mohica, Ralph Meeker, and David Canary. Its plot follows a Native American who, after serving in the Vietnam War, returns to his New Mexico desert hometown to find it victimized by a domineering white rancher, and enacts revenge.

The film was distributed by Twentieth Century-Fox.

== Cast ==
- Victor Mohica as Johnny Firecloud
- Ralph Meeker as Colby
- David Canary as Jesse
- Frank de Kova as White Eagle
- Christina Hart as June
- Sacheen Littlefeather as Nenya
- Jason Ledger as J. B.
- John F. Goff as Newt
- Richard Kennedy as Ned
- George Buck Flower as Wade

== Production ==
Filming took place in California in the fall of 1974.

== Release ==
The film screened in Albuquerque, New Mexico beginning on July 25, 1975. It later opened in Los Angeles on November 5, 1975.

Something Weird Video released the film on DVD as a double feature with Bummer! in 2001.

== See also ==
- Weird West

== Sources ==
- Berumen, Frank Javier Garcia (November 20, 2020). American Indian Image Makers of Hollywood. Jefferson, North Carolina: McFarland. ISBN 978-1-476-67813-9.
- Pitts, Michael R. (2012). Western Movies: A Guide to 5,105 Feature Films (2nd ed.). Jefferson, North Carolina: McFarland. ISBN 978-0-786-46372-5.
- Willis, Donald (1997). Horror and Science Fiction Films. Vol. IV. Lanham, Maryland: Scarecrow Press. ISBN 978-0-810-83055-4.
