= I Am Offering This Poem =

Poem by Jimmy Santiago Baca

"I Am Offering This Poem" is a poem by Jimmy Santiago Baca, first published in Immigrants in Our Own Land (1979). It was reprinted in 1990 in the collection Immigrants in Our Own Land and Selected Early Poems. Baca’s diction and imagery convey a central theme of the work- the importance of poetry and art in general.

== History ==
Jimmy Santiago Baca, an American poet of Hispanos descent, began writing poetry during five years he spent in prison (1973-1978) for drug charges. During these years, he learned to read and began writing the poetry that reflected his personal story of incarceration, and the complex world of the US penal system.

“I am Offering This Poem” deals with the themes of the importance of art for survival in oppressive environments, lack of material possessions and love.

It has been said to be a love poem that "insist[s] that love itself is a gift more valuable and sustaining than any material comfort."
