= 29th Street Rep =

The 29th Street Rep is a New York, New York-based theatrical company whose productions qualify as Off-Off-Broadway. Founded by actors in April 1988, the 29th Street Rep has staged 78 fully staged productions through 2007. The company's motto is "29th St Rep - Where Brutal Theater Lives!"

== Background ==
Among the highlights of the theater's history are the appearance of actor Edward Norton in the 1993 production of playwright Bill Nave's allegory Bible Burlesque, the 1994 New York première of Tracy Letts's Killer Joe (which was revived in 1998 at the commercial Soho Playhouse), and Tracers by John DiFusco and the ensemble, which received recognition from American Theatre Magazine as a "Top Ten Play of 1997" and a Drama Desk nomination for Best Revival of a Play. Other important productions including Christopher Durang's Titanic/Actor's Nightmare and Beth Henley's The Wake of Jamey Foster.

== Productions ==
The 29th Street Rep's 2000 production of its adaptation of nine short stories from Charles Bukowski's South of No North (Tales of the Buried Life) was a big hit, running over 100 performances. This was followed by ts revival of Sam Shepard's Fool for Love enjoyed a 19-week run of 122 total performances, ranking as the company's most successful production at the box office. In 2003, the Rep's production of Charles Willeford's High Priest of California was cited by The New York Times as one of the best Off-Broadway plays of the season.

The Lincoln Center Theater Archives has videotaped, for preservation, the 29th Street Rep's productions of Killer Joe, Pig, Bobby Supreme, Avenue A, South of No North , High Priest of California, and Jack Henry Abbott's In the Belly of the Beast Revisited.

The Company closed their performance space in 2008. They continue to produce, and maintain a rehearsal space and office above their old venue.
