= Science Education at the Crossroads =

Annual conference for innovative science-education discussions

Science Education at the Crossroads is an annual national academic conference, initially funded by the National Science Foundation, designed to enable and upskill stakeholders in science education to confer in a productive manner. The conference also claims to offer alternatives to the standard model of conferring and professional development. The conference was created by John Settlage of the University of Connecticut, and Adam Johnston of Weber State University.

== Philosophy ==
There are many organizations and conferences that exist for science educators, including the National Science Teachers Association (NSTA), the National Association for Research in Science Teaching (NARST), the Association for Science Teacher Education (ASTE), and many others dedicated to specific fields (e.g., physics and chemistry) within science education. These organizations focus on presenting research results or sharing innovations in teaching. Crossroads uses a different approach for conference sessions, the Vexation and Venture. This format has been described as an "incubator forum" which allows for an interactive, discussion-based, and dynamic intersection of views. This mode of interaction has been shown to engage presenters and participants in a way that new ideas and problems can be proposed, and the group takes on responsibility for a generative session.

In this format, problems (vexations) are dissected, and their possible specific solutions (ventures) are proposed. In this manner, the process of research and innovation is presented in a public forum in its early development stages rather than after its completion, as would be the case in other academic conference formats.

== History ==
Crossroads originated from a disenchantment with more traditional education conferences. As a consequence, Crossroads was designed, utilizing the Vexation and Venture formats, to make generative discussions a deliberate feature of the conference.

Crossroads has a history of finding a specific place and space each year for conferring. Oscillating from venue to venue has allowed each year to have its own character, as well as allow people from specific regions to have more access to the conference. Crossroads has been held at the following venues:

- Storrs, CT (2005)
- Ogden, UT (2006)
- Amherst, MA (2007)
- Alta, UT (2008)
- Portland, OR (2009)
- San Antonio, TX (2011)
- Providence, RI (2012)
- Portland, OR (2014)
- Cleveland, OH (2015)

Crossroads has a history of inviting poets as keynote speakers to its conferences. These have included:

- Taylor Mali (2005)
- Jimmy Santiago Baca, joined by Jason Yurcic (2006)
- Marilyn Nelson (2007)
- David Lee (2008)
- Lawson Fusao Inada (2009)
- Naomi Shihab Nye (2011)

Additionally, illustrator, artist, and educator Fred Lynch contributed the keynote address in 2012.

Crossroads has also established a line of work that has called for scholarly work in science education to reach out to create a significant impact in education. This has been referred to as "scholar activism" by David Moss, Crossroads' first keynote speaker in 2005. Other speakers have included John Settlage in 2006, Adam Johnston in 2007, Heidi Carlone in 2008, and Magnia George in 2009. Conference organizers have contributed joint addresses in 2011 and 2012.

== Future ==
Science Education at the Crossroads has moved the location of their conference each fall, from east to west and back again, through the year 2009. Most notably, National Science Foundation funding was established to fund the conference from 2007 to 2009.
