= Blood In Blood Out =

1993 film directed by Taylor Hackford

- Theatrical release poster
- Directed by: Taylor Hackford
- Screenplay by: Jimmy Santiago Baca; Jeremy Iacone; Floyd Mutrux
- Story by: Ross Thomas
- Produced by: Taylor Hackford; Jerry Gershwin
- Starring: Jesse Borrego; Benjamin Bratt; Enrique Castillo; Damian Chapa
- Cinematography: Gabriel Beristain
- Edited by: Fredric Steinkamp; Karl F. Steinkamp
- Music by: Bill Conti
- Production company: Hollywood Pictures
- Distributed by: Buena Vista Pictures Distribution
- Release date: April 30, 1993 (United States)
- Running time: 180 minutes
- Country: United States
- Languages: English; Spanish
- Budget: $35 million
- Box office: $4,496,583

Blood In Blood Out (also known as Bound by Honor and Blood In Blood Out: Bound By Honor) is a 1993 American epic crime drama film directed by Taylor Hackford, from a screenplay co-written by Jimmy Santiago Baca and Floyd Mutrux. The film follows the intertwining lives of three Chicano relatives from 1972 to 1984. They start out as members of a street gang in East Los Angeles, and as dramatic incidents occur, their lives and friendships are forever changed.

The film stars Jesse Borrego, Benjamin Bratt, Enrique Castillo, and Damian Chapa. The screenplay is partly autobiographical, drawn from Baca's experiences in street gangs and imprisonment. The film's title refers to the initiation ritual of having to kill someone to enter a gang and, on the reverse end, not being able to leave the gang unless killed.

The film was released by Buena Vista Pictures Distribution on April 30, 1993. Critical reviews were mixed to positive, and Blood In Blood Out was a box office disappointment, but later became a cult classic film among parts of the Mexican-American community.

== Plot ==
In 1972, after a violent confrontation with his abusive father, Miklo Velka, a teenager of half-Mexican descent, leaves Las Vegas for East Los Angeles. He moves in with his cousins, Paco and Cruz, who are members of the Vatos Locos gang. Miklo joins the gang following an attack on their rivals, the Tres Puntos. Tres Puntos retaliates by attacking Cruz, permanently damaging his back. When Vatos Locos counterattack the next day, Miklo kills Spider, the leader of Tres Puntos. Fleeing the scene, Paco crashes their car; both he and Miklo are arrested.

The cousins' paths diverge: Miklo is imprisoned in San Quentin for murder, Paco volunteers for military service in the Marine Corps in lieu of prison, and Cruz continues his passion for art. Due to his back pain, Cruz becomes addicted to heroin, leading to the accidental overdose of his 12-year-old brother, Juanito. After the Marines, Paco joins the Los Angeles Police Department, eventually working as an undercover detective for them.

Meanwhile, Miklo finds that San Quentin is run by three racially defined prison gangs: the Black Guerrilla Army (BGA) led by Bonafide, the Aryan Vanguard led by Red Ryder, and La Onda led by Montana Segura. Popeye, a high-ranking member of La Onda, tries to rape Miklo at knifepoint but is stopped by Montana, who finds Popeye's intentions dishonorable. Miklo learns that the only way into La Onda is by killing an inmate from a rival gang. He forms a rapport with Aryan Vanguard associate Big Al, then kills him in the prison kitchen. Now initiated, Miklo rises through the La Onda ranks, eventually joining its Ruling Council.

After serving nine years, Miklo is granted parole. On the outside, disgusted by his menial job, he joins in an armed robbery. The heist goes poorly and Miklo is intercepted by Paco, who tries to persuade him to surrender his weapon and resolve the situation peacefully. Miklo instead starts to flee, and Paco shoots him in the leg. The leg is amputated, and Miklo is sent back to prison.

Miklo notices that cocaine use is now rampant, driven by competing supplies from the BGA and La Onda council member Carlos. The Aryan Vanguard want to partner with Carlos as his supplier, offering to help Carlos take the BGA out of the cocaine business. Montana, against La Onda being in the drug trade, warns that the Aryans want to start a war between the Black and Chicano inmates. The Council votes in agreement with Montana, resulting in Carlos and some others leaving La Onda to work with the Aryan Vanguard.

Carlos has his non-inmate brother, Smokey, bomb the BGA's stash house in the city. Carlos also kills "Pockets", who runs the BGA's operation in San Quentin. As Montana feared, the Aryan Vanguard then lets the BGA murder Carlos. With rising hostility between Blacks and Chicanos, Montana and Bonafide meet in the prison yard. Montana convinces Bonafide to agree to a truce if Montana reaches out to La Onda leaders in other prisons to end the violence. The warden grants Montana special permission to visit the prisons and Miklo is left in charge.

Montana is granted a special request to have his daughter visit him at a prison. Before she arrives, he is stabbed to death by someone from the BGA. Believing the Aryan Vanguard sent forged orders to the hitman, Paco arranges a peace conference between La Onda and the BGA, but Miklo uses the talks to build an alliance with the BGA and plan the joint killing of Aryan Vanguard leaders. After the Aryans are killed, Miklo's men double cross and murder the BGA leaders as well. Furious, Paco confronts Miklo, disowning him forever.

The warden vows to split La Onda's ruling council by sending them to prisons in other states. Miklo uses this to expand La Onda across the Southwest. It is later revealed that Magic, not the Aryan Vanguard, sent the forged orders to have the BGA kill Montana at Miklo's behest. As Miklo destroys the evidence of their betrayal, Magic swears his life to Miklo as his jefe. In East Los Angeles, Paco visits one of Cruz' murals, showing a portrait of his former life. In a pep talk with Cruz, Paco realizes that by ordering Miklo to go after Spider, Paco is responsible for what Miklo has become. He forgives Miklo, as well as himself.

== Cast ==
- Jesse Borrego as Cruz Candelaria
- Benjamin Bratt as Paco Aguilar
- Enrique Castillo as Montana Segura
- Damian Chapa as Miklo Velka
- Delroy Lindo as Bonafide
- Tom Wilson as Rollie McCann
- Karmin Murcelo as Dolores
- Ving Rhames as Lieutenant Ivan
- Jenny Gago as Lupe
- Victor Rivers as Magic
- Carlos Carrasco as Popeye
- Geoffrey Rivas as Carlos
- Tom Towles as Red Ryder
- Billy Bob Thornton as Lightning
- Teddy Wilson as Wallace
- Lanny Flaherty as Big Al
- Mike Genovese as Sergeant Bob Devereaux
- Steven Anthony Jones as Cyclone
- Harold J. Surratt as Pockets
- Ray Oriel as Spider
- Valente Rodriguez as Frankie
- Raymond Cruz as Chuy
- Danny Trejo as Geronimo
- Victor Mohica as Mano
- Luis Contreras as Realthing
- Richard Masur as Jerry
- Lupe Ontiveros as Carmen
- Natalija Nogulich as Janis
- Jeffrey Tanzella as inmate

== Production ==
=== Development ===
The origin for Blood In Blood Out had its genesis in the early 1980s when producer Jerry Gershwin hired novelist Ross Thomas to write the first script, which initially went into development under director Harold Becker at New Visions Pictures, a production company owned by Taylor Hackford.

Actor Edward James Olmos was offered the chance to both direct and star in the film, but due to creative differences, Olmos turned down the project. Other actors considered for roles in the film included Andy García, Lou Diamond Phillips, and Sean Penn.

After New Visions Pictures folded, Hackford would take over directing duties, he saw the project as an opportunity to make a hard-edged prison genre film in the tradition of White Heat and I Am a Fugitive from a Chain Gang. Hackford pitched the idea to Jeffrey Katzenberg, who showed interest, the project would end up being distributed through Hollywood Pictures and Buena Vista Pictures, both subsidiaries of The Walt Disney Studios.

Floyd Mutrux was then hired to work on the script, as did screenwriter Jeremy Iacone, and writer/poet Jimmy Santiago Baca, whom Hackford credits with contributing most of the final story, which Baca had based on his life experiences.

The three prison gangs in the film are fictional creations of screenwriter Jimmy Santiago Baca and director Taylor Hackford. However, they were all loosely based on actual prison gangs, with the Aryan Vanguard, Black Guerrilla Army and La Onda representing the Aryan Brotherhood, Black Guerrilla Family, and the Mexican Mafia, respectively.

Artist Adan Hernandez was hired to create the paintings the character of Cruz Candelaria fictively painted. All of the paintings in the film were created by him, including the monumental oil painting called The Death of Juanito. Like the other paintings Hernandez made at this time, it was deeply influenced by film noir, which is why his works are termed "Chicano Noir." As one critic described it, "Hernandez would fashion nocturnal urban worlds whose beauty seemed to function as bait. All too often, it was just a lure or trap to expose some sucker to the very real dangers that were hidden inside of that flashy urban world. Just as a moth would be consumed by an irresistible flame, the hapless rube could be crushed in a car wreck, shot by an unseen bullet breaking through the night, blown to smithereens by an exploding bomb, or, for unseen reasons, become just another body crashing through a plate glass window and tumbling to earth. Or one might become a homeless man, sleeping on a bed of newspapers and broken dreams, bathed all night long by flashing neon lights that herald attractions that are forever just out of reach."

A rumor circulated regarding the mural shown in the film's climax, with some believing it had been painted over. In reality, the production did not have permission to paint directly on the reservoir wall. Instead, a local artist created the mural on plywood panels, which were placed in front of the wall to create the appearance of a painted surface.

The production was granted permission to leave the mural in place for a limited time following the film's release. The artist later removed the work, and the painting was disassembled into multiple sections.

Adán Hernández died on May 15, 2021. His family retains much of the original artwork.[15] Juanito, one of the paintings made for the film, is in the collection of the San Antonio Museum of Art. Hernández also made a brief cameo appearance in the film in an art gallery scene, as a drug dealer named Gilbert.

=== Filming ===
Principal photography began in May 1991, with the film being shot in and around Los Angeles and East Los Angeles. During production, a caterer was wounded in a drive-by shooting in El Sereno, when crew members were fired upon while taking down a set. Other locations included sound stages at Raleigh Studios.

The filmmakers were granted permission to film inside the walls of San Quentin State Prison, where much of the film's plot takes place. Several of the then-inmates appear in the film as extras. In addition, several of the prison staff members also appear as others and some facilitated the production of the film by serving as technical advisors. Many members of the staff were given small lines in the film, with the warden giving an extended cameo in a part that is somewhat integral to the plot. In addition, actor Danny Trejo, who appears in the film as Geronimo, had served time in San Quentin before deciding to become an actor.

In addition to prison inmates and staff and artist Hernandez, screenwriter and barrio poet Jimmy Santiago Baca cameos as a prison inmate and member of the La Onda council.

Actor Theodore Wilson died shortly after filming his scenes in the film.

The film's title, 'Blood in blood out' refers to the initiation ritual of having to kill someone to enter a gang and, on the reverse end, not being able to leave the gang unless killed. This is a common initiation in many gangs, including prison gangs, and is also the motto of La Onda in the film.

The film was originally supposed to be part one of a two-part film that Hackford had wanted to do, but wasn't able to complete.

=== Post-production ===
Executives at the studio, including Disney CEO Michael Eisner, had grown concerned about the potential effect the film could have on Los Angeles following the 1992 LA riots, especially after the attribution that was given to Boyz n the Hood as a partial cause of or inspiration for the civil unrest.

== Reception ==
=== Release ===
In early 1993, the film and its marketing campaign were given a week-long test run, playing at two or three theaters in several cities across the country, including: Rochester, New York and Tucson, Arizona, early test-screening audiences responded positively, and studio executives predicted that the film would gross $40 million at the box office, Buena Vista would run half a dozen ads on TV along with print advertising. However, at a screening in Las Vegas, Nevada, theater managers had called in the police to break up a fistfight between two couples, twenty minutes before the film was to start. According to Hackford, this incident caused the studio to rethink the marketing campaign for the film, including changing the film's title to 'Bound by Honor', as the studio felt that the original title might incite violence in theaters, Hackford had stated that he was very unhappy with this decision, as the film's message was the exact opposite of the one that the studio feared could be transmitted.

The film was released nationally on thirty screens on April 30, 1993, but delayed in the Los Angeles markets until May 21, 1993, when the Rodney King civil rights trial verdict was to be handed down. The city feared a repeat of the 1992 riots following the acquittal of four Los Angeles Police Department officers charged with beating King.

=== Box office ===
The box-office sales totaled $1 million from 391 theaters on opening weekend. Distributors did not plan to expand the release further, as crossover appeal to non-Hispanic audiences was not apparent.

=== Critical response ===
The film received mixed reviews from critics. On Rotten Tomatoes, it has an approval rating of 64% based on reviews from 14 critics, with an average rating of 5.6/10. On Metacritic, it has a weighted average score of 47 out of 100 based on reviews from 12 critics, indicating "mixed or average" reviews.

Kenneth Turan of the Los Angeles Times was critical of the film, called it "approximately three hours of violent, cartoonish posturing incongruously set in the realistically evoked milieu of East Los Angeles", while Mim Eichler, also of the Los Angeles Times, praised the film, calling it "A riveting odyssey, rich with myth and unforgettable imagery. It is a feast of sight and sound--poetry, music, dance and emotion--and possibly one of the most powerful and important films of the decade".

Film critic Jonathan Rosenbaum for the Chicago Reader wrote that this "ugly three-hour snoozefest is apparently supposed to do for East Los Angeles Chicanos what the Godfather movies did for New York mafiosi..." In a mixed two-star review, Roger Ebert of The Chicago Sun-Times declared that the film had "effective performances [and] moments of deeply felt truth," but unlike American Me, "What Bound by Honor lacks is a vision to bring meaning to the material".

Owen Gleiberman of Entertainment Weekly gave Bound By Honor a largely positive review with a rating of B−. He stated: "Bound By Honor comes fully alive when it moves behind bars. There's an exploitative thrill built into the genre..." Gleiberman was more interested in the second half of the film once Miklo was in jail running La Onda. Vincent Canby of The New York Times wrote: "The film is big and long, passionate and flat. It's full of heroic and tragic incident, but skimpy about the details of quotidian lives". Canby exalted some of the characters in the film - one in particular, Enrique Castillo. Although Vincent Canby does not give an official rating for the film, he concluded: "Though it's not the epic it means to be, it is not a failure".

== See also ==
- American Me
- South Central
- List of hood films
