= Getting Away with Murder (film) =

- Film poster
- Directed by: Harvey Miller
- Written by: Harvey Miller
- Produced by: Penny Marshall; Frank Price
- Starring: Dan Aykroyd; Lily Tomlin; Jack Lemmon; Bonnie Hunt; Brian Kerwin
- Cinematography: Frank Tidy
- Edited by: Richard Nord
- Music by: John Debney
- Distributed by: Savoy Pictures
- Release date: April 12, 1996
- Running time: 92 minutes
- Country: United States
- Language: English
- Box office: $197,322

Getting Away with Murder is a 1996 American black comedy film directed and written by Harvey Miller.

== Plot ==
Ethics professor Jack Lambert's neighbor Max Mueller is revealed on the TV news to be escaped Nazi war criminal Karl Luger, whom the courts sentenced to death. Pressured by the news media's allegations, Mueller plans escape to South America.

Angered that Mueller might never pay for his crimes, Lambert takes the drastic step of poisoning him by injecting cyanide into some of the fruit in Mueller's apple tree, from which he regularly makes freshly juiced apple juice. The police initially believe it's a suicide, greatly upsetting Lambert, who mails them a cryptic letter explaining that it was actually a murder to carry out the court sentence and to avenge all the lives taken.

Later, the TV news reveals that Mueller was misidentified and is innocent. Feeling guilty, Lambert atones by dumping his fiancée Gail and marrying Mueller's daughter Inga. However, after the wedding, Lambert receives information assuring him of Mueller's guilt.

== Cast ==
- Dan Aykroyd as Jack Lambert
- Lily Tomlin as Inga Mueller
- Jack Lemmon as Max Mueller / Karl Luger
- Bonnie Hunt as Dr. Gail Holland
- Brian Kerwin as Marty Lambert
- Jerry Adler as Judge
- Andy Romano as Psychiatrist
- Robert Fields as Sergeant Roarke
- J. C. Quinn as Detective Stanley
- Marissa Chibas as Liz Lambert
- Jon Korkes as Chemistry Lab Professor
- Kathleen Marshall as Student #1
- Rino Romano as Student #5
- Dave Nichols as Lawyer Brownell
- Damon D'Oliveira as Electronic Salesman
- Wayne Robson as Bartender
- Richard Blackburn as Nazi Sympathizer #1
- Thomas Mitchell as Nazi Sympathizer #2
- Kevin Frank as Martys Party Guest #2

== Reception ==
This was veteran writer and director Harvey Miller's final project. It received poor reviews from critics. On the review aggregator website Rotten Tomatoes, 0% of 8 critics' reviews are positive, with an average rating of 3.6/10.

Daniel M. Kimmel of Variety described the film as "a distasteful affair that should embarrass all concerned. A lighthearted comedy about the Holocaust and an accused Nazi war criminal, it opened with little advance word and no advance screenings. That strategy was the one smart move Savoy made concerning this film, since this one is D.O.A."

Janet Maslin of The New York Times wrote that "Miller's film looks professional and polished, but its comic timing is unerringly flat. Despite literate dialogue and the efforts of a worthy cast, the whole thing lacks any humorous spark. [...] Like Faithful, another indifferent comedy left behind after the demise of Savoy Pictures, Getting Away with Murder doesn't have anything radically wrong with it. All that's wrong is that it doesn't get anything right."

Reviewing the HBO/Savoy video release, Erin Richter of Entertainment Weekly said that "release delays and limited theatrical runs for comedies with seemingly solid casts don't always indicate a problem film, but they do in the case of writer-director Harvey Miller's paean to one man's attempt at righteousness. [...] What could have been a smart and sardonic—not to mention timely—social commentary turns into a humorless collection of caricatures that even the more forgiving video screen doesn't improve."

The opening paragraph of James Berardinelli's review of the film for ReelViews read:

Some movies are ruined in post-production. Many more are destroyed during filming. A still greater number are undone in the script-writing process. I'm not sure exactly when Getting Away with Murder should have been relegated to the scrap heap, but it was probably while the premise was being developed into the final screenplay. With the right tone and intent, it's possible to make a bitingly funny film about a grave issue. Unfortunately, Getting Away with Murder wants to be light and airy, not dark and incisive. It shrinks from risks that might alienate a casual viewer, and, by its very blandness and adherence to "traditional" structure, crosses the line of dubious taste into the realm of the offensive.

Roger Ebert gave the film two out of four stars, writing, "Here is a film that tries to find comedy in the Holocaust, and it looks in the wrong places, in the wrong way, and becomes a sad embarrassment."

Nathan Rabin wrote, "Murder suffers from what I call Craig Brewer Syndrome [...] Filmmakers afflicted with Craig Brewer Syndrome make the least offensive films out of the most offensive premises. [...] Lemmon and Tomlin deliver better performances than the material warrants. A deceptively playful Lemmon is plausible as both a genocidal monster in hiding and a harmless old man and Tomlin's uncompromising performance is refreshingly devoid of sentimentality. Yet their best efforts are wasted in a movie that aspires to make audiences laugh and think and only achieves half its goals."

== Home media ==
After the film's theatrical run, HBO released the movie onto VHS. In 2004, the film was released on DVD.
