= Pulp (novel) =

1994 novel by Charles Bukowski

- First edition cover
- Author: Charles Bukowski
- Language: English
- Genre: Detective fiction, absurdist fiction, postmodernism
- Publisher: Black Sparrow Press
- Publication date: May 1994
- Publication place: United States
- Media type: Print
- Pages: 202
- Preceded by: Hollywood

Pulp is the last completed novel by Los Angeles poet and writer Charles Bukowski. It was published in 1994, shortly before Bukowski's death. He began writing it in 1991 and encountered several problems during its creation. He fell ill during the spring of 1993, only three-quarters of the way through Pulp.

== Plot ==
Pulp is a pulp fiction novel which acts also as a meta-pulp. Pulp comments on the obsessions of the pulp fiction genre, making fun of itself as stereotypical of the genre in the grimiest form. Bukowski dedicates the story to "bad writing", as Bukowski did not plan his mystery novel well and frequently wrote Nicky Belane into holes from which he could not escape. Bukowski wrote some of his most violent, cynical, sarcastic, and shocking work during the final months of his life. Many critics have agreed this novel exemplifies Bukowski showing an acceptance of his own pending mortality.

A convoluted detective story about a hard-boiled private eye who solves his cases by waiting them out, Pulp evokes Raymond Chandler, an author who lived in Los Angeles and set stories there, as did Bukowski. The novel also bears similarity to some works by Dashiell Hammett; and the name of character Nicky Belane rhymes suggestively with the name of author Mickey Spillane as well as Casablanca's main character Rick Blaine.

== Main characters ==
=== Nicky Belane ===
Unlike other Bukowski novels, the narrator is not Henry Chinaski (although he does appear); instead, the novel follows private detective Nicky Belane as he attempts to track down French author Céline and the elusive Red Sparrow. Belane is a low-life private "dick" (or private investigator), who, like Bukowski, is unemployed more often than not. Also, like the author, Belane has a cynical attitude toward the world which is exacerbated by his excessive drinking.

=== Lady Death ===
Lady Death is a beautiful and mysterious woman who hires Belane to find Céline. She is a barely concealed metaphor for death, hiring Belane because Céline has thus far escaped her grasp.

=== Celine ===
Louis-Ferdinand Céline always hangs around a book store, where he reads a few pages, and gets kicked out by the owner for not buying anything. The true identity of Celine remains a mystery throughout much of the novel, with Belane constantly saying that Celine died years ago from the first chapter of the book.

=== Jack Bass ===
Jack Bass is a client of Belane, who is suspicious that his wife is cheating on him.

=== Red Sparrow ===
The Red Sparrow is a spoof of the Black Sparrow Press, owned by John Martin, who is parodied as John Barton in the novel. The Red Sparrow symbolizes the coming of Belane's and Bukowski's own death. Belane gets "enveloped" by the Sparrow in the way a dead writer gets absorbed by his words—as printed, in this case, by Black Sparrow Press.

== Critical reception ==
In author George Stade's New York Times review of Pulp, he remarked, "As parody, Pulp does not cut very deep. As a farewell to readers, as a gesture of rapprochement with death, as Bukowski's sendup and send-off of himself, this bio-parable cuts as deep as you would want."

== Pop culture references ==
The song "Private Eye" by the Chicago melodic punk band, Alkaline Trio, is a reference to this novel as a whole.

Scottish band The Fratellis have a couple of references to the book in their 2013 record "We Need Medicine", including a song called "Jeannie Nitro" and references to "Celine and Lady Death" in the song "Whisky Saga".
