= Stratusfaction (TV program) =

- Genre: Variety show
- Country of origin: Canada
- Original language: English
- No. of seasons: 1
- No. of episodes: 6

Production
- Producer: Dave Robertson
- Production location: Winnipeg
- Running time: 30 minutes

Original release
- Network: CBC Television
- Release: 28 July – 8 September 1973

Stratusfaction is a Canadian music variety show that aired on CBC Television in mid-1973.

== Premise ==
Stratusfaction was an 18-member Calgary music group which performed throughout western Canada since 1971. They starred in this mid-year replacement program to perform theatrical and pop songs. Guest artists were featured in each episode except the final: Ed Evanko, Dianne Heatherington, Catherine McKinnon, Pat Rose and Diane Stapley. It was recorded in Winnipeg on location at the Manitoba Theatre Centre during June 1973.

== Scheduling ==
This half-hour program was broadcast Saturdays at 7:00 p.m. from 28 July to 8 September 1973.
