= The Charles Bukowski Tapes =

1987 film by Barbet Schroeder

- Directed by: Barbet Schroeder
- Written by: Barbet Schroeder
- Produced by: Barbet Schroeder
- Starring: Charles Bukowski
- Cinematography: Steven Hirsh, Elliot Enzig Porter, Paul Challacombe
- Edited by: Barbet Schroeder, Paul Challacombe
- Music by: Jean Louis Vallero
- Release date: 1985
- Country: France
- Language: English

The Charles Bukowski Tapes are a collection of short interviews with the American writer/poet Charles Bukowski, filmed and assembled by Barbet Schroeder and first published in 1985. Today, the video documentary is considered a cult classic.

== Plot ==
The Charles Bukowski Tapes are an altogether more than four hours long collection of 52 short-interviews with the American cult author Charles Bukowski, sorted by topic and each between one and ten minutes long. Director Barbet Schroeder (Barfly) interviews Bukowski about such themes as alcohol, violence, and women, and Bukowski answers willingly, losing himself in sometimes minute-long monologues. Amongst other things, Bukowski leads the small camera team through his parents’ house and his former neighbourhood, but the largest part of the interviews takes place in Bukowski's flat or backyard. The documentary includes a scene in which Bukowski reacts violently toward his wife Linda Lee.

== History of origin ==
The documentary was assembled from about 64 hours of film footage, which occurred during the three-year lead time for Schroeder's motion picture Barfly, for which Bukowski wrote the autobiographical script.

== Critical reception ==
An outrageously stimulating and unnerving all-night drinking session with a gutter eloquent barroom philosopher. […] One of the most intimate, revealing and unsparing glimpses any film or video has ever given us of a writer’s life and personality.

— Michael Wilmington, The Los Angeles Times
