= John Martin (publisher) =

American publisher (1930–2025)

John Martin (October 30, 1930 – June 23, 2025) was an American publisher who founded the Black Sparrow Press. As a publisher, he was best known for his work with Charles Bukowski, John Fante, and Paul Bowles. He was based in Santa Rosa, California.

Martin built a successful office supply business in Los Angeles in the 1960s, eventually becoming the manager of a forty-person operation. He had been a book collector since the age of twenty, eventually amassing a collection of D. H. Lawrence first editions, which he sold to UC Santa Barbara for $50,000 to fund the founding of Black Sparrow Press.

== Work with Charles Bukowski ==
Martin considered Bukowski “the new Walt Whitman” and founded Black Sparrow Press explicitly to publish Bukowski's work.

At the time, Bukowski was mostly publishing small chapbooks, essentially pamphlets in small, cheap editions. Martin's office supply business gave him access to a printing press, and his first publication under the Black Sparrow imprint was a 1966 Bukowski broadside for the poem “True Story,” which was printed in an edition of 30.

In 1969, Martin offered Bukowski a $100 per month salary to quit his job and write full-time, which Bukowski accepted. Martin suggested a novel would be easier to sell than a collection of poems. A month later, Bukowski submitted his first novel, Post Office. Martin was frequently referenced as a character in Bukowski's work, including appearing as the character John Barton in the author's final novel, Pulp.

== Work with other authors ==
In his career, Martin was known as a champion of underground or avant-garde literature. Under Martin's watch, Black Sparrow went on to publish works by many prominent literary figures such as Robert Duncan, Denise Levertov, Robert Creeley, Diane Wakoski, David Bromige, Joyce Carol Oates, John Ashbery, Wanda Coleman, Charles Reznikoff, Kenneth Koch, Wyndham Lewis, Fielding Dawson, and Ed Sanders.

Black Sparrow's books were known for several unique design features, which Martin adopted to make his books noticeable on bookshelves. He made his books 6 inches by 9 inches, which was larger-than-standard at the time; he also used textured matte paper and bold, colorful letterpress printing. After the end of the 1960s, all of the press's covers were designed by Martin's wife, Barbara.

== Sale of Black Sparrow ==
Aside from Bukowski, the publisher's two best-selling authors were Paul Bowles and John Fante. In 2002, HarperCollins imprint Ecco Press purchased the rights to Black Sparrow authors Bukowski, Bowles, and Fante for a "seven-figure" deal brokered by Ecco founder Dan Halpern; the rest of Black Sparrow's backlist was sold to Boston-based publisher David R. Godine for $1. This sale price included all of Black Sparrow's remaining inventory, in order to continue providing royalty income to the publisher's authors.

== Death ==
Martin died on June 23, 2025, at the age of 94.
