= Vexatious =

Vexatious may refer to:

- Frivolous or vexatious, a legal term
- Vexatious litigation, a legal action brought solely to harass someone
- Vexatious requester, a term used for a certain class of requestor that can be denied under the UK Freedom of Information Act
- Vexatious (horse), an American Thoroughbred racehorse
