= Vexation and Venture =

Conference format

"Vexation and Venture" is a conference format designed so problems and dilemmas are presented within small groups in an interactive format. Key components of this conference format include:

- The presenter of the Vexation and Venture has produced a problem ("vexation") and specific solution ("venture") to the problem, and is open to a group's input on these.
- In conferences where this format has been used successfully, such as Science Education at the Crossroads, the vexation and venture must be submitted in a written form, not to exceed 1500 words. Conference organizers and editors offer feedback to initial drafts of these papers, suggest revisions (usually commenting upon ways to make the venture more specific to the individual), and accept final vexation/venture pieces to accompany the conference in the form of a proceedings.
- The vexation/venture is presented in a small group format, consisting of 6-12 engaged individuals, known as an Incubator Forum. These sessions are directed by a facilitator who maintains equitable contributions and the following timetable for specific stages:

- Statement: 10 minutes for the presenter to describe the Vexation and Venture (without interruption)
- Clarify: 5 minutes for the participants to ask clarifying questions of the presenter (with response from the presenter)
- Incubate: 15 minutes for the participants to discuss the Vexation and Venture of the presenter (without any input from the presenter), and finally
- Rejoin: 5 minutes for the presenter to become un-gagged and respond, ask questions, and/or summarize what they've heard.

Variations of this process have been used in other settings (e.g., Great Books). Within educational environments, especially among professionals, the format of speaking of the unknown and establishing a forum for new ideas and prospects is unique, since most academic conferences are places at which information and ideas are disseminated, rather than generated.

== Other Features ==
- Facilitator. Having a designated facilitator has proven to be essential. This individual is not a participant in the conversation but instead has the responsibility of keeping the session on track and on time. A smart facilitator recognizes nebulous vexations, languorous ventures, and aimless talk – and is unafraid to intervene. Likewise, a facilitator will remain in the background when presenters and participants are suitably occupied.
- Preparation. Working on the Vexation and Venture in advance of the event is crucial. Each participant should create a written Vexation and Venture document that is made available to all participants in advance (electronically and/or as hard copy). For academic audiences, a target of 1500 words has proven to be ideal.
- Feedback and edits. Creating a written Vexation and Venture that to be critiqued by session organizers is a powerful exercise. Be expected to hone frustrations and to articulate ambitions supplies clarity for author and audience alike. Proposed Vexations and Ventures are treated as best first drafts that inevitably must be modified is response to feedback — it is almost painful for everyone but the results make it worthwhile.
- Silence and attention. Listening with an open mind and doing so in silence is not a common trait, especially among professionals. Perhaps most pivotal is the silence by the presenter during the latter half of the Vexation and Venture format.
- Trust and safety. Risk is an inherent feature of the Vexation and Venture presentation. Careful selection of participants and establishing an appropriate climate are paramount. If presenters feel too vulnerable, then they won’t feel they can trust the group enough to share their concerns and endeavor. Only when the group demonstrates appropriate care will the presenter provide a wholehearted basis for conversation and will the participants supply the thoughtful commentary that will benefit everyone.

== Examples ==
Science Education at the Crossroads
Design Based Research Conference 2013
