= Jimmy Santiago Baca =

American poet and educator (born 1952)

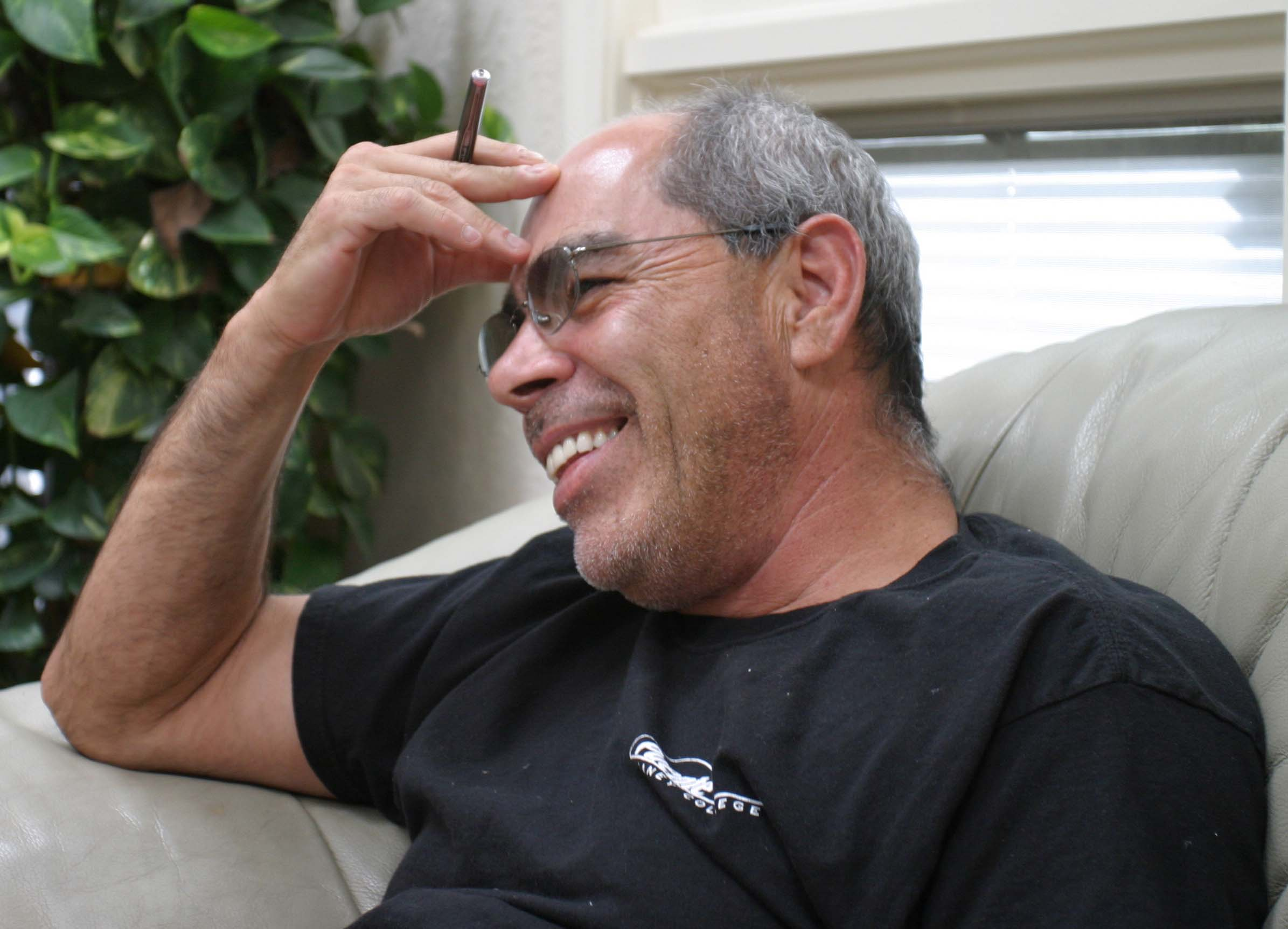
- Baca during the videotaping of Add-Verse, 2004
- Born: January 2, 1952 (age 74); Santa Fe, New Mexico, U.S.
- Occupation: Poet
- Spouse: Married
- Writing career
- Notable works: Martin and Meditations on the South Valley
- Notable awards: American Book Award, Pushcart Prize, International Hispanic Heritage Award, International Award.
- Website: www.jimmysantiagobaca.com

Jimmy Santiago Baca (born January 2, 1952) is an American poet, memoirist, and screenwriter from New Mexico.

== Early life and education ==
Baca was born in Santa Fe County, New Mexico, in 1952. Abandoned by his parents at the age of two, he lived with one of his grandmothers for several years before being placed in an orphanage. At the age of 13 he ran away and wound up living on the streets. When he was 21, he was convicted on charges of drug possession and incarcerated. He served five years in prison, three of them in isolation, and having expressed a desire to go to school (the guards considered this dangerous), he was put in the same area of the prison with the inmates on death row for a period of time before he was released.

During this time, Baca taught himself to read and write, and he began to compose poetry. He wrote an essay called "Coming Into Language," which is about his upbringing and the challenges he had to face. Baca wrote this piece in the order of his life from the start to the end. He talked about his struggles in prison and how he took a book and started to teach himself the beauty of literature. He discovered a way to express himself which is the beauty of it all. He sold these poems to fellow inmates in exchange for cigarettes. A fellow inmate convinced him to submit some of his poems to the magazine Mother Jones, then edited by Denise Levertov. Levertov printed Baca's poems and began corresponding with him, eventually finding a publisher for his first book.

== Career ==
Santiago Baca reading at the Georgetown Lannan Center for Poetics and Social Practice in 2014.

Immigrants in Our Own Land, Baca's first major collection, was published by the Louisiana State University Press in 1979. This early collection included "I Am Offering This Poem," a poem later reprinted in 1990's Immigrants in Our Own Land and Selected Early Poems and anthologized in The Seagull Book of Poems. In 1987, his semi-autobiographical minor epic in verse, Martin & Meditations on the South Valley, received the American Book Award for poetry, bringing Baca international acclaim and, in 1989, the Hispanic Heritage Award in Literature.

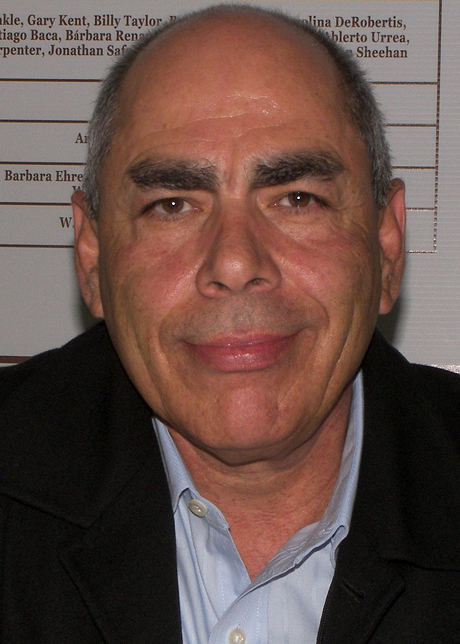
Baca at the 2009 Oregon Book Festival.

In 2004 Baca started a non-profit organization, Cedar Tree, Inc., that supports literary workshops for inmates and troubled youth, through charitable donations. As well as writing workshops, Cedar Tree has produced two documentary films Clamor en Chino and Moving the River Back Home. The organization employs ex-offenders as interns.

== Published works ==
Baca's poetry collections include C-Train and Thirteen Mexicans: Dream Boy's Story (Grove Press, 2002), Healing Earthquakes (2001), Set This Book on Fire (1999), In the Way of the Sun (1997), Black Mesa Poems (1995), Poems Taken from My Yard (1986), and What's Happening (1982). His "memoir", A Place to Stand (2001), chronicles his troubled youth and the five-year jail-stint that brought about his personal transformation. The poet Will Inman published Mr. Baca's poetry in his 1977 anthology Fired Up with You: Poems of a Niagara Vision (Border Press), one of the earliest anthologies to include Jimmy Santiago Baca's poems. Baca is also the author of a collection of stories and essays, Working in the Dark: Reflections of a Poet of the Barrio (1992); a play, Los tres hijos de Julia (1991); a screenplay, Bound by Honor, which was released by Hollywood Pictures as Blood In Blood Out in 1993; he also published at the end of 1993 Second Chances. Baca's most recent novel is A Glass of Water (2009). He published an original essay in 2013 called, "The Face," in ebook form with Restless Books, along with digital editions of his Breaking Bread with the Darkness poetry volumes.

== Bibliographical Resources ==
https://faculty.ucmerced.edu/mmartin-rodriguez/index_files/vhBacaJimmy.htm

== Other media ==
Santiago Baca wrote the screenplay for a Hollywood production, Blood In Blood Out. Baca also appeared as an actor in the film and as one of its producers.

A film based on Baca's memoir A Place to Stand, directed by Daniel Glick, was released in 2014. The film was produced by Gabriel Baca, David Gruban, and Andres Salazar The creators of the movie also made a school curriculum to strengthen and highlight the morals within Baca's life story, containing a workbook and films.

In 2003, Baca appeared in an episode of Def Poetry Jam.

== See also ==
- List of Mexican American writers
- Baca family of New Mexico
