= Wanda Coleman =

American poet (1946–2013)

- Born: November 13, 1946; Los Angeles, CA
- Died: November 22, 2013 (aged 67); Los Angeles, CA
- Occupation: Writer
- Known for: Poetry

Wanda Coleman (November 13, 1946 – November 22, 2013) was an American poet. She was known as "the L.A. Blueswoman" and "the unofficial poet laureate of Los Angeles".

== Biography ==
Wanda Evans was born in the Watts neighborhood of Los Angeles, where she grew up during the 1950s and 1960s. She is the eldest of four children. Her parents were George and Lewana (Scott) Evans, who were introduced to one another at church by his aunt. In 1931, her father had relocated to Los Angeles from Little Rock, Arkansas, after the lynching of a young man who was hung from a church steeple. He was an ex-boxer and long-time friend and sparring partner of Light Heavyweight Champion Archie Moore. In Los Angeles, he ran a sign shop during the day and worked the graveyard shift as a janitor at RCA Victor Records. Her mother worked as a seamstress and as a housekeeper for Ronald Reagan, among other celebrities.

According to the Poetry Foundation, Coleman wrote her first poems at age 5 and had her first ones published in a local newspaper at age 13.

After graduating from John C. Fremont High School in Los Angeles, Wanda Evans enrolled at Los Angeles Valley College in Van Nuys, California. She transferred to California State University at Los Angeles, but did not complete a degree.

Shortly after finishing high school, she married white Southerner Charles Coleman, a troubleshooter for the Student Non-Violent Coordinating Committee (SNCC) in the 1960s. Their union produced two children, Luanda and Anthony. She went on to marry two more times. Her second marriage produced her second son, Ian. Her third husband was poet Austin Straus, whom she married in 1981.

After divorcing her first husband, Coleman worked a variety of jobs to make ends meet as a single mother, including waiting, typing, and editing a soft-core pornography magazine. She wrote for a number of men's magazines under the pseudonym Andrew L. Tate.

She and Straus hosted a radio show, Pacifica Radio's "Poetry Connexion", from 1981 to 1996. On the show they interviewed both local and internationally known writers. In a 2020 New Yorker article, author Dan Chiasson refers to an interview Coleman did with the Poetry Society of America where she describes herself as a “Usually Het Interracially Married Los Angeles-based African American Womonist Matrilinear Working Class Poor Pink/White Collar College Drop-out Baby Boomer Earth Mother and Closet Smoker Unmolested-by-her-father.”

Within her writing, whether it be fiction, essays, or poetry, Coleman introduces and develops characters whose lives bring to light social inequalities.

Coleman received fellowships from the John Simon Guggenheim Foundation, the National Endowment for the Arts, and the California Arts Council (in fiction and in poetry). She was the first C.O.L.A. Literary Fellow (Los Angeles Department of Cultural Affairs, 2003). Her honors included an Emmy in Daytime Drama writing (the first African American woman to receive such an honor), the 1999 Lenore Marshall Prize (for Bathwater Wine), and a finalist for the 2001 National Book Awards (for Mercurochrome). She was a finalist for California poet laureate (2005).

Coleman died on November 22, 2013, at Cedars-Sinai Medical Center in Los Angeles. She had been ill for a while. The Los Angeles Times described Coleman as "a force on the Los Angeles poetry scene" and the city's unofficial poet laureate.

After her death, Black Sparrow Press, Coleman's longtime publisher, released Wicked Enchantment: Selected Poems, Edited & Introduced by Terrance Hayes in 2020. The collection draws work from all of Coleman's Black Sparrow Press books, which spanned from 1983 to 2005. Author Mary Karr wrote, "Wicked Enchantment has words to crack you open and heal you where it counts—hateful and hilarious, heartbroken and hellbent."

Wicked Enchantment: Selected Poems quickly received critical acclaim upon publication. In a piece for the New Yorker entitled "The Fearless Invention of One of L.A.'s Greatest Poets," critic Dan Chiasson wrote "One of the greatest poets ever to come out of L.A., she shaped the city's literary scene like few before her. . . . Rarely does a poet seem to want to take an already brutally brief form and speed it up. But Coleman's sonnets are sprints, which is what makes their improvisations, modelled on American blues and jazz, so compelling."

Writing online for Poetry in a piece entitled "Heart First Into This Ruin", Lizzy LeRud wrote: "Today, Coleman's significance is unquestioned.... In Wicked Enchantment, Coleman's fans, new and old, will find some of her most vital challenges to American racism and its market-driven culture, rendered in her uniquely unsettling lyric voice. Her work pushes us to confront injustice with as much candor as she did—and with as much care."

As of 2022, Wanda Coleman has published fifteen poetry books and chapbooks, two mixed-genre books (poetry and fiction), two book of short stories, one novel, and two books of nonfiction.

== Controversy ==
While critically acclaimed for her creative writing, Coleman's brush with notoriety came as a result of an unfavorable review she wrote in the April 14, 2002, issue of the Los Angeles Times Book Review of Maya Angelou's book A Song Flung Up to Heaven. Coleman found the book to be "small and inauthentic, without ideas wisdom or vision". Coleman's review provoked positive and negative responses, including the cancellation of events and the rescinding of invitations. Her account of this incident appears in the September 16, 2002, edition of The Nation.

"In our post-9/11 America, where unwarranted suspicions and the fear of terrorism threaten to overwhelm long-coveted individual freedoms, a book review seems rather insignificant—until the twin specters of censorship and oppression are raised. What has made our nation great, despite its tortuous history steeped in slavery, are those who have persisted in honoring those freedoms, starting with the Constitution and its amendments. It is this striving toward making those freedoms available to every citizen, regardless of race, creed, color, gender or origin, that makes the rest of the insanity tolerable. It is what allows me to voice my opinion, be it praise song or dissent, no matter who disagrees.".

== Books ==
- Heart First Into This Ruin: The Complete American Sonnets. Black Sparrow Press. 2022.
- Wicked Enchantment: Selected Poems. Black Sparrow Press. 2020. ISBN 978-1574232370.
- The Love Project. (with Austin Straus). Red Hen Press. 2014
- The World Falls Away. University of Pittsburgh Press. 2011. ISBN 9780822961642.
- Jazz and Twelve O'Clock Tales. Black Sparrow Press. 2008. ISBN 9781574232127.
- The Riot Inside Me: More Trials & Tremors. Black Sparrow Press. 2005. ISBN 9781574232004.
- Ostinato Vamps. Pitt Poetry Series, 2003–2004. ISBN 9780822958338
- Mercurochrome. Black Sparrow Press. 2001. ISBN 9781574231533. (National Book Awards finalist)
- Mambo Hips and Make Believe: A Novel. Black Sparrow Press. 1999. p. 4. ISBN 9781574230949.
- Bathwater Wine. Black Sparrow Press. 1998. ISBN 9781574230642.
- Native In a Strange Land: Trials & Tremors. Black Sparrow Press. 1996. ISBN 9781574230222.
- Hand Dance. Black Sparrow Press. 1993. ISBN 9780876858967.
- African Sleeping Sickness: Stories & Poems. Black Sparrow Press. 1990. ISBN 9780876858127.
- A War of Eyes and Other Stories. Black Sparrow Press. 1988. ISBN 9780876857359.
- Heavy Daughter Blues: Poems & Stories 1968-1986 Black Sparrow Press. 1987.
- Imagoes. Black Sparrow Press. 1983. ISBN 9780876855096
- Mad Dog Black Lady. Black Sparrow Press. 1979. ISBN 9780876854129.

== Chapbooks and limited editions ==
- Moon Cherries. Sore Dove Press. 2005.
- Wanda Coleman: Greatest Hits 1966-2003. Pudding House Publications. 2004.
- American Sonnets. Woodland Pattern. 1994.
- The Dicksboro Hotel & Other Travels. Ambrosia Press. 1989.
- Art in the Court of the Blue Fag. Black Sparrow Press. 1977.
