= The Diane Stapley Show =

- Genre: Music variety
- Country of origin: Canada
- Original language: English
- No. of seasons: 2

Production
- Producer: Dave Robertson
- Production location: Winnipeg
- Running time: 30 minutes

Original release
- Network: CBC Television
- Release: 22 January – 31 December 1976

The Diane Stapley Show is a Canadian music variety television series that aired on CBC Television in 1976.

== Premise ==
This Winnipeg-produced series featured singer Diane Stapley who previously appeared in various CBC productions. She performed most selections on the program, generally of the theatrical, torch and MOR genres. Dave Shaw led the 16-member series house band. Visiting artists included Leon Bibb, Dinah Christie, Tom Gallant, Gordon Pinsent and Dean Regan.

The initial run of 13 episodes was videotaped in mid-1975. The show design was altered after the eight episode was produced due to a change of leadership in CBC's Variety department. The series introduction was delayed to January 1976, accompanied by a national promotional tour by Stapley. The series was given a final second season for late 1976.

== Scheduling ==
This series was broadcast on Fridays at 7:30 p.m. (Eastern) from 22 January to 27 May 1976, then from 24 September to 31 December 1976.
