= Taylor Hackford =

American film director (born 1944)

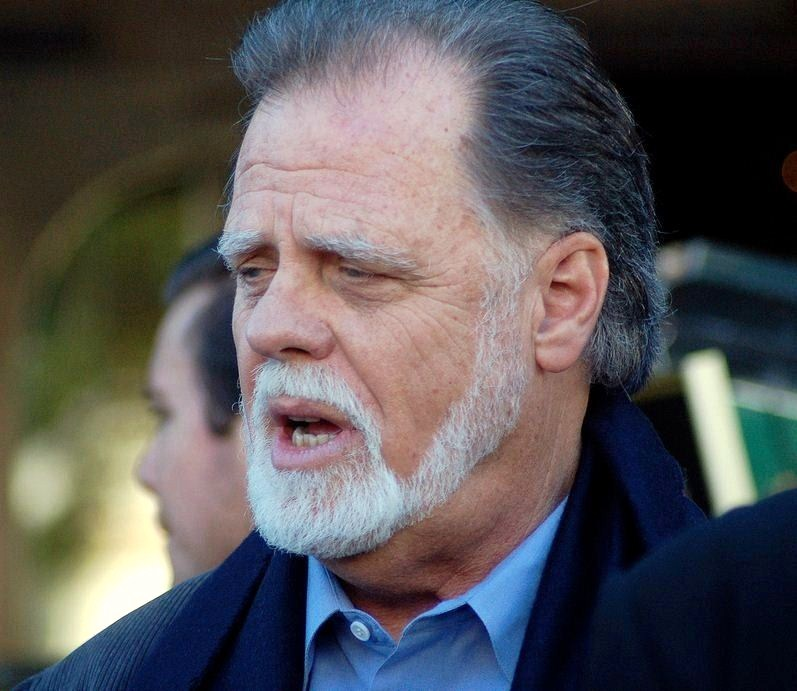
- Hackford in January 2013
- Born: Taylor Edwin Hackford; December 31, 1944 (age 81); Santa Barbara, California, United States
- Occupation: Film director
- Years active: 1971–present
- Spouses: Georgie Lowres (m. 1967; div. 1972); Lynne Littman (m. 1977; div. 1987); Helen Mirren (m. 1997)
- Children: 2, including Rio

Taylor Edwin Hackford (born December 31, 1944) is an American film director and former president of the Directors Guild of America. He won the Academy Award for Best Live Action Short Film for Teenage Father (1979). Hackford went on to direct a number of highly regarded feature films, including An Officer and a Gentleman (1982), The Devil's Advocate (1997) and Ray (2004), for the latter of which he was nominated for an Academy Award for Best Director and Academy Award for Best Picture.

== Early life ==
Hackford was born on December 31, 1944, in Santa Barbara, California. His mother is Mary E. (née Taylor), a waitress, and his father is Joseph Hackford. He graduated from the University of Southern California in 1968, where he was a pre-law major focusing on international relations and economics. After graduating, he served as a Peace Corps volunteer in Bolivia, where he started using Super 8 film in his spare time. The camera was purchased for him by fellow Peace Corps volunteer, Dennis Holt. He decided that he did not want to pursue a career in law, and instead got a mailroom position at KCET. At KCET he was the associate producer on the Leon Russell special "Homewood" in 1970. In 1973 at KCET he produced the one-hour special Bukowski (about the poet Charles Bukowski), directed by Richard Davies.

== Career ==
Hackford's feature directorial debut was The Idolmaker starred Ray Sharkey, who was awarded a Golden Globe for Best Actor for his portrayal of "Vinnie" in the film. The music supervisor was Richard Flanzer. Hackford said of The Idolmaker, "I make films about working-class people; showbusiness is one of those things through which people can get themselves out of the lower rung of society. To me, the compelling story in The Idolmaker is the guy with a wonderful talent and a fairly strong ego has to make it happen through puppets."

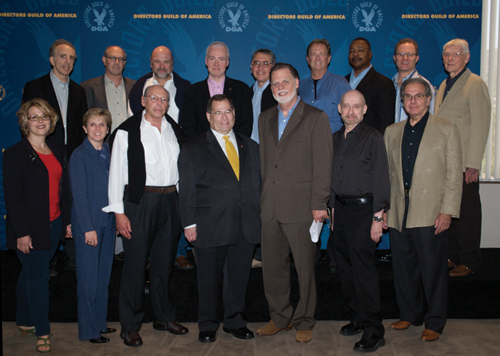
DGA welcomes Jerry Nadler including Taylor Hackford.(June 10, 2009)

During the filming of An Officer and a Gentleman, Hackford kept Lou Gossett Jr. in separate living quarters from the other actors so he could intimidate them more during his scenes as a drill instructor. Richard Gere originally balked at shooting the ending, which involves his character arriving at his lover's factory wearing his Navy dress whites and carrying her off from the factory floor. Gere thought the ending would not work because it was too sentimental, and Hackford was initially inclined to agree with Gere, until during a rehearsal when the extras playing the workers began to cheer and cry. But when Gere saw the scene later with the music underneath it at the right tempo, he said it sent chills up the back of his neck, and is now convinced Hackford made the right decision.

In 1983, Hackford partnered with Keith Barish, film producer, to co-develop a film version of At Play in the Fields of the Lord, for which both Hackford and Barish received a lawsuit in 1986, claiming they had an option to exercise the rights from MGM/UA Entertainment Co., a film distributor.

Hackford's 1993 film Blood In, Blood Out became a Chicano cult classic film and brought national attention to Adan Hernandez, the artist who created the paintings for the film's fictive artist.

Hackford said of his film Ray: "My proudest moments in Ray were in those 'chitlin' clubs. Ray Charles ended his life in concert halls, where people would go in tuxedos and quietly listen to a genius perform. But in these clubs, he had to get people up dancing. What I tried to create was a little of that energy and exuberance. The great thing about music is when you can get people on their feet."

In a 2005 interview, Hackford confirmed that he never watched his own films: "When I finish a film, I put it away and I never look at it again. Occasionally I do now because of the DVDs and the commentary tracks. I usually put it aside and go onto the next. I never went to film school. I worked for the KCET public television station in L.A. I worked in concerts. I have done a lot of music. I feel very comfortable shooting music, and I think you can see that." Hackford has also directed music videos, including "Against All Odds (Take a Look at Me Now)" by Phil Collins and "Say You, Say Me" by Lionel Richie.

On July 25, 2009, Hackford was elected president of the Directors Guild of America. He was re-elected to a second, two-year term as president on June 25, 2011, at the DGA's National Biennial Convention in Los Angeles.

== Personal life ==
Hackford has been married three times. He married his first wife, Georgie Lowres, in 1967; they had one child, Rio Hackford (1970–2022). The couple divorced in 1972. In 1977, Hackford married Lynne Littman, with whom he has one child, Alexander Hackford, born in 1979; their marriage lasted until 1987. Hackford has been married to Helen Mirren since 1997.

Hackford met Mirren when he was directing her in White Nights, although their first meeting did not go well: he kept her waiting to audition for White Nights, and she was icy. "It was a strange way to meet Helen, because she is a lovely person," says Hackford, "but she didn't hold back her fury." Hackford and Mirren wed in 1997, although as a young woman Mirren had vowed never to marry. The couple live along the Nevada side of Lake Tahoe.

In 2009, Hackford signed a petition in support of director Roman Polanski, calling for his release after his arrest in Switzerland in relation to his 1977 charge for statutory rape, after Steve Cooley, the Los Angeles District Attorney, tried to prosecute Polanski.

== Filmography ==
Year	Film	Director	Producer	Writer	Notes
1973	Bukowski	No	Yes	Yes	Documentary
1978	Teenage Father	Yes	Yes	Yes	Short film Academy Award for Best Live Action Short Film
1980	The Idolmaker	Yes	No	uncredited	
1982	An Officer and a Gentleman	Yes	No	No	Nominated – Directors Guild of America Award for Outstanding Directing
1984	Against All Odds	Yes	Yes	No	
1985	White Nights	Yes	Yes	No	
1986	A Tribute to Rick Nelson	No	No	No	TV short documentary
1987	Hail! Hail! Rock 'n' Roll	Yes	No	No	Documentary
1988	Everybody's All-American	Yes	Yes	No	
1993	Blood In, Blood Out	Yes	Yes	No	(originally: Bound by Honor)
1995	Dolores Claiborne	Yes	Yes	No	
1997	The Devil's Advocate	Yes	Executive	No	
2000	Proof of Life	Yes	Yes	No	
2004	Ray	Yes	Yes	Story	Nominated – Academy Award for Best Picture; Nominated – Academy Award for Best Director; Nominated – Directors Guild of America Award for Outstanding Directing
2010	Love Ranch	Yes	Yes	No	
2013	Parker	Yes	Yes	No	
2016	The Comedian	Yes	Yes	No	

Executive producer only

- Rooftops (1989)
- The Long Walk Home (1990)
- Queens Logic (1991)
- Mortal Thoughts (1991)
- Sweet Talker (1991)
- Defenseless (1991)
- A Place to Stand (2014) (Documentary)

Producer only

- La Bamba (1987)
- When We Were Kings (1996) (Documentary)
- G:MT – Greenwich Mean Time (1999)

== Accolades for films directed by Hackford ==
Year	Title	Academy Awards		BAFTAs		Golden Globes	
Year	Title	Nominations	Wins	Nominations	Wins	Nominations	Wins
1978	Teenage Father	1	1				
1980	The Idolmaker					2	1
1982	An Officer and a Gentleman	6	2	2	1	8	2
1984	Against All Odds	1				1	
1985	White Nights	2	1			2	1
2004	Ray	6	2	4	2	2	1
Total		16	6	6	3	15	5

Directed Academy Award performances
Under Hackford's direction, these actors have received Academy Award wins and nominations for their performances in their respective roles.

Year	Performer	Film	Result
Academy Award for Best Actor
2004	Jamie Foxx	Ray	Won
Academy Award for Best Actress
1982	Debra Winger	An Officer and a Gentleman	Nominated
Academy Award for Best Supporting Actor
1982	Louis Gossett Jr.	An Officer and a Gentleman	Won
