= Barfly (film) =

1987 film by Barbet Schroeder

- Theatrical release poster
- Directed by: Barbet Schroeder
- Written by: Charles Bukowski
- Produced by: Tom Luddy; Fred Roos; Barbet Schroeder
- Starring: Mickey Rourke; Faye Dunaway; Alice Krige; J. C. Quinn; Frank Stallone
- Cinematography: Robby Müller
- Edited by: Éva Gárdos
- Music by: Jack Baran
- Production company: American Zoetrope
- Distributed by: The Cannon Group, Inc.
- Release date: October 16, 1987
- Running time: 97 minutes
- Country: United States
- Language: English
- Budget: $5 million
- Box office: $3.2 million

Barfly is a 1987 American black comedy film directed by Barbet Schroeder and starring Mickey Rourke and Faye Dunaway. The film is a semi-autobiography of poet/author Charles Bukowski during the time he spent drinking heavily in Los Angeles, and it presents Bukowski's alter ego Henry Chinaski. The screenplay, written by Bukowski, was commissioned by the Iranian-born Swiss film director Barbet Schroeder, and it was published (with illustrations by the author) in 1984, when film production was still pending.

The Kino Flo light, now a ubiquitous tool in the film industry, was specially created by Robby Müller's electrical crew for the bathroom scene with Henry and Wanda, which would have been difficult to light using the conventional lampheads available at the time.

The film was "presented by" Francis Ford Coppola and features a cameo by Bukowski. It was entered into the 1987 Cannes Film Festival, where it competed for the Palme d'Or.

== Plot ==
Destitute alcoholic Henry Chinaski lives in a Los Angeles rundown apartment and works menial jobs when he can find them. He also writes poetry and short stories which he submits to magazines and papers for little money.

Henry frequents The Golden Horn, a bar where he drinks, hangs out with other alcoholics, and gets into altercations with the bartender he hates, Eddie. One night, Henry gets into a fight with Eddie and loses. To gain energy and win the next fight, he takes a sandwich from a patron and eats it, disgusting the patron and angering the bar owner, Jim, one of Henry's best friends. Jim tells Henry to go lie down in his apartment. After an afternoon nap, Henry steals food from another apartment to eat in preparation to fight Eddie.

Henry then returns to The Golden Horn and antagonizes Eddie until the latter challenges him to another fight, which Henry wins. Henry then staggers on to the Kenmore, a nearby establishment where he continues his imbibement. There, he meets Wanda, an alcoholic and a kept woman. Wanda is initially annoyed with Henry, saying that she "hates people," but ends up being intrigued by him. The two buy liquor at a nearby store, and Wanda steals corn from a cornfield, attracting the attention of the police. The two run to her apartment, evading them. Wanda boils the corn but discovers it is green and inedible and freaks out, saying that nothing in her life ever works out. Henry comforts her.

However, things become acrimonious between Henry and Wanda when Henry discovers that Wanda has slept with Eddie. After he chastises her for it, Wanda beats Henry with her purse, knocking him unconscious. Later, a detective following Henry sees him covered in blood and calls 911. Two paramedics arrive and are unfazed by Henry's being covered in blood, telling him not to waste their time. Wanda returns later, and the two apologize to one another. That night, Wanda claims to be dying in bed, seeing angels. Henry calls 911 and the same paramedics arrive, much to his surprise, and claim Wanda is just drunk and "too fat."

After Wanda leaves to look for a job the next morning, Henry is tracked down by Tully Sorenson, a wealthy book publisher who has been impressed with his writing and is interested in publishing some of his work. She finds him through the detective she has hired. Knowing Henry is destitute, Tully pays him an "advance" of $500. Henry then breaks into another apartment after hearing a man abusing his wife. After the man threatens to cut his wife's throat, he and Henry get into an altercation which results in the man being stabbed. Henry scrambles out of the apartment building and goes for a drive in L.A. with Tully. At one point, he rams a car where a man and woman are making out while the light is green. Tully says he was immature and reckless in his response. She then takes him back to her home where, after drinks, the two have sex.

At first, Henry is impressed with the promise of wealth and security, including an endless supply of booze that working for Tully could provide. However, he begins to realize that he is uncomfortable being involved with Tully, romantically or professionally, because of class differences, saying that she is "trapped in a cage with golden bars". Henry determines he must leave. He and Wanda go to the Golden Horn, where Henry requests a round on him for the entire bar. To Eddie's surprise, Henry pays with some of the advance he received from Tully and sarcastically leaves a tip for Eddie, saying "Buy a drink on me." Tully heads out to see if she can change his mind and finds him at the bar where a drunken, jealous Wanda proceeds to beat her up. When Henry does not intercede, Tully realizes that Henry does not care about her and does not want her help. So she leaves the bar and gives up on publishing his work.

Eddie calls Henry out, and they go out behind the bar for another fight. Henry and the other barflies follow Eddie out the door, the fight starts, and the crowd cheers the two men.

== Cast ==
- Mickey Rourke as Henry Chinaski
- Faye Dunaway as Wanda Wilcox
- Alice Krige as Tully Sorenson
- Jack Nance as Detective
- J. C. Quinn as Jim
- Frank Stallone as Eddie
- Sandy Martin as Janice
- Roberta Bassin as Lilly
- Gloria LeRoy as Grandma Moses
- Joe Unger as Ben
- Harry Cohn as Rick
- Pruitt Taylor Vince as Joe
- Fritz Feld as Bum
- Charles Bukowski as Oldtimer
- Albert Henderson as Louie

== Production ==
Charles Bukowski wanted Sean Penn to star as protagonist Henry Chinaski, but Penn insisted that Dennis Hopper direct the film. Bukowski had written the screenplay for Barbet Schroeder, who had filmed him for French TV years before, but would not surrender the script to Hopper, whom he despised as a gold-chain-wearing Hollywood phony; Bukowski and Penn remained friends for the rest of Bukowski's life.

There is a scene where the camera tilts up over Faye Dunaway's legs. This glamour shot was done at her insistence and was not in the original screenplay.

The apartment building where Wanda's apartment is located was an actual building where Charles Bukowski and his lover Jane Cooney Baker, the real-life counterparts to Henry and Wanda, had lived. No one knew this until Bukowski, who was watching the filming, remembered.

The opening and closing song for the film is the 1967 instrumental "Hip Hug-Her" by Booker T. & the M.G.'s, released in their 1967 album.

Filming locations included the Bryson Apartment Hotel.

== Bukowski's reaction to the film ==
Charles Bukowski had mixed reactions about the lead performance by Mickey Rourke. In an interview in the 2003 documentary film Born into This, Bukowski said that Rourke "didn't get it right... He had it all kind of exaggerated, untrue. He was a little bit showoff about it. So, no, it was kind of misdone." This contrasted with a 1987 interview Bukowski had conducted with film critic Roger Ebert on the set of Barfly, in which Bukowski said he thought Rourke was "doing a good acting job. I didn't really expect him to be so good." In addition, the original 1987 press kit for the film included a letter by Bukowski titled "A Letter from a Fan", in which the writer stated: "Part of my luck was the actor who played Henry Chinaski. Mickey Rourke stayed with the dialogue to the word and the sound intended. What surprised me was that he added another dimension to the character, in spirit. Mickey appeared to really love his role, and yet without exaggeration he added his own flavor, his zest, his madness, his gamble to Henry Chinaski without destroying the intent or the meaning of the character. To add spirit to spirit can be dangerous but not in the hands of a damned good actor. Without distorting, he added, and I was very pleased with the love and understanding he lent to the role of the BARFLY".

Bukowski later novelized his experiences surrounding the film in the book Hollywood.

== Critical reception ==
Barfly received positive reviews from critics, holding a 76% rating on Rotten Tomatoes based on 25 reviews, with an average rating of 6.7/10.

Describing the film as both "stomach churning" and "riveting", Rita Kempley reviewing the film for The Washington Post, panned the bar fight scene between Dunaway and Krige, writing that the "...cat fight on skid row is as preposterous as the script as a whole, an absurdist, steroid-induced fantasy dreamed by a Norman Mailer clone."

== Awards and honors ==
- Nominee, Best Actress-Drama – Golden Globes (Faye Dunaway)
- Nominee, Palme d'Or – Cannes Film Festival
- Nominee, Best Cinematography – Independent Spirit Awards (Robby Müller)
- Nominee, Best Actor – Independent Spirit Awards (Mickey Rourke)

== In popular culture ==
The NOFX song "Green Corn" on their 1991 album Ribbed references Tully in the lyrics, "Tully, baby, you're trapped behind your golden bars; I'm the prince of poverty hangin' out in bars", and finishes with the lyrics, "maybe what we had was just green corn".

A line of dialogue from the movie was used in a track titled "Only Angel" from Harry Styles' self-titled debut album.

In an episode of the television series Mission Hill, Andy French mistakenly rents Barfly while seeking movies with notable vomit scenes.

The film is referenced in 2009 American drama film Precious.
