= Black Sparrow Press =

American publisher

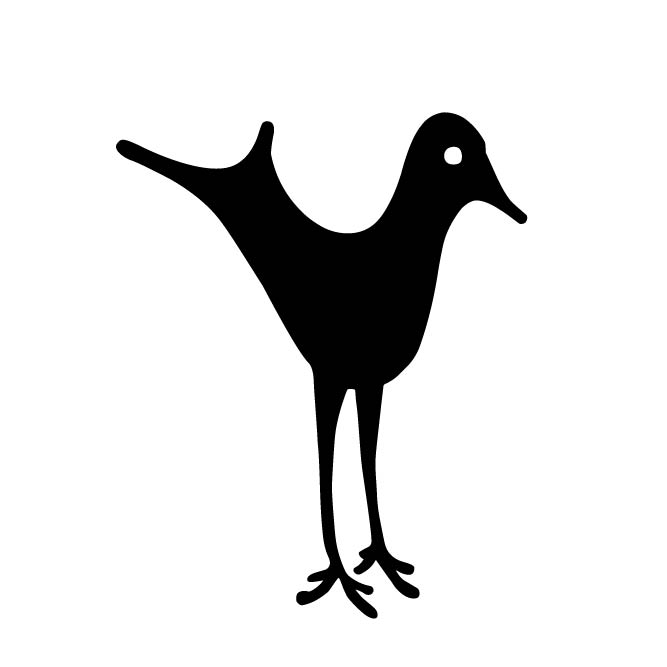
- Parent company: Godine
- Founded: 1966
- Founder: John Martin
- Defunct: 2002
- Country of origin: United States
- Headquarters location: Boston
- Distribution: Ingram / Two Rivers
- Key people: Will Thorndike, President David Allender, Publisher Celia Johnson, Senior Editor
- Publication types: Books
- Fiction genres: Poetry, Literary fiction
- No. of employees: 5
- Official website: godine.com

Black Sparrow Press is a New England based independent book publisher, known for literary fiction and poetry.

== History ==
Black Sparrow was founded in Los Angeles, California, in 1966 by John Martin in order to publish the works of Charles Bukowski and other avant-garde authors. Barbara Martin co-founded the press with her husband and, as the press's lead designer, she was responsible for its distinctive and bold covers. After 35 years, and 700 titles, John Martin sold the company in 2002.

In 2020, John Martin agreed that Godine would continue Black Sparrow's publishing legacy. In early 2020, the press released Wicked Enchantment: Selected Poems, the first new edition of work by Wanda Coleman since the author's passing in 2013; the collection is edited and introduced by Terrance Hayes. Coleman is a long-time Black Sparrow author and one of its most important poets.

In March 2020, as part of a relaunch of its parent company, Black Sparrow joined Two Rivers Distribution, an Ingram brand, for sales of its titles to readers worldwide.

== Notable awards and honors ==
- Eddie Chuculate, PEN/O. Henry Prize 2007.
- Wanda Coleman, Lenore Marshall Poetry Prize 1999, National Book Award Poetry Finalist 2001.
- Naomi Replansky, William Carlos Williams Award 2013, Poetry Society of America
