= Shine, Perishing Republic =

Poem by Robinson Jeffers

Shine, Perishing Republic

While this America settles in the mould of its vulgarity, heavily thickening to empire,
And protest, only a bubble in the molten mass, pops and sighs out, and the mass hardens,

I sadly smiling remember that the flower fades to make fruit, the fruit rots to make earth.
Out of the mother; and through the spring exultances, ripeness and decadence; and home to the mother.

You making haste haste on decay: not blameworthy; life is good, be it stubbornly long or suddenly
A mortal splendor: meteors are not needed less than mountains: shine, perishing republic.

But for my children, I would have them keep their distance from the thickening center; corruption
Never has been compulsory, when the cities lie at the monster's feet there are left the mountains.

And boys, be in nothing so moderate as in love of man, a clever servant, insufferable master.
There is the trap that catches noblest spirits, that caught—they say—God, when he walked on earth.

"Shine, Perishing Republic" is a poem by the American writer Robinson Jeffers, first published in 1925 in the collection Roan Stallion, Tamar, and Other Poems. It describes an increasingly corrupt American empire, which it advises readers to view through the naturalizing perspective of social cycles. Jeffers wrote two companion poems in the 1930s: "Shine, Republic" and "Shine, Empire".

== Background ==
Robinson Jeffers wrote "Shine, Perishing Republic" in 1921–1922.

== Structure and summary ==
"Shine, Perishing Republic" consists of five couplets and each line has nine or ten stressed syllables. The first two couplets establish Jeffers' assessment of the contemporary United States. The third couplet explains his view of the relationship between history and nature. The last two couplets cover what this means for the individual and the family.

Jeffers opens up with the metaphor of a mold and a molten mass to signify the vulgar American culture and the corrupt American people. He views all attempts at reversing the decadence as meaningless, because it is part of a natural social cycle. Jeffers uses the metaphor of a flower that gives way to a fruit, which in turn decays and returns to the soil. By keeping a distant perspective, it is possible to celebrate the splendor of America's decline from republic to empire. Jeffers then addresses his twin sons and wishes for them to keep a distance from the corrupt urban areas, which are the centers of the decay. He also advices them to be moderate in their attachment to other human beings.

== Themes and analysis ==
Jeffers describes an America which after World War I had secured its position as the dominant power in the West, and thereby definitely had abandoned the agrarian vision of the Jeffersonian republic. This places Jeffers' perspective on social cycles in a different context than, for example, the Founding Fathers' discussions about ancient republics and empires, Thomas Cole's painting series The Course of Empire (1833–1836) or the poet Walt Whitman's recognition of decay and dissolution. Discarding American exceptionalism, Jeffers views the United States—now more prosperous than ever and in the age of skyscrapers—as an integral and leading example of a broader crisis of the West. America exists within the world and spectacularly displays the decay that had been described in the Old World by Friedrich Nietzsche, Søren Kierkegaard and Sigmund Freud.

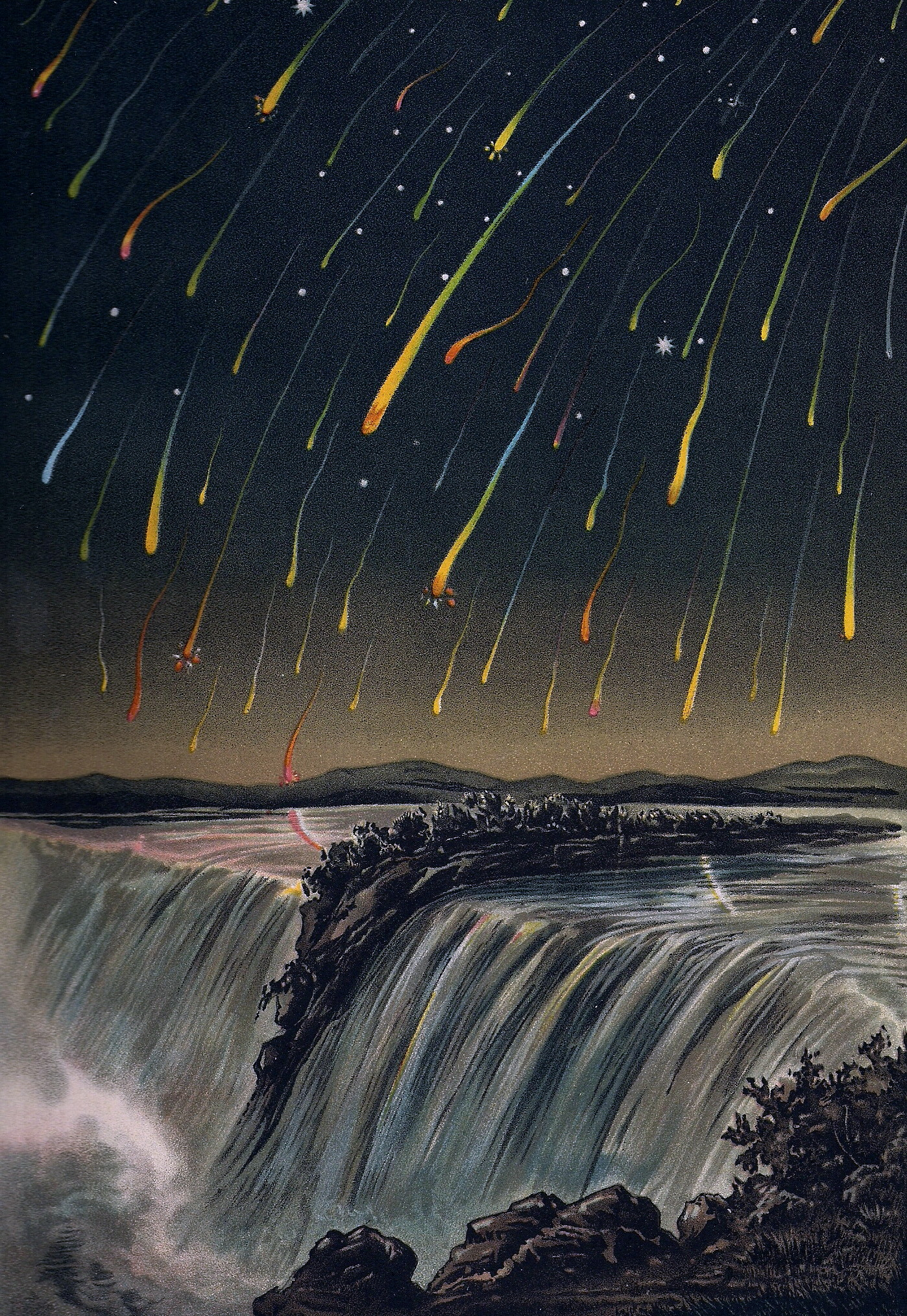
Leonid Meteor Storm over North America on the night of November 12–13, 1833

Jeffers' portrayal of a decaying empire uses both industrial and organic imagery: it is a "molten mass" and a "monster". The natural imagery continues with the "mortal splendor" of meteors, which conceals the "vulgarity" and "thickening center; corruption". Human agency is recognized within the empire itself, although it is limited to the ability to accelerate decay. As politics and history are part of a natural process of growth and decay, the real task for the human individual is to find a comprehensive way to regard this process. The poem offers an answer to how both corruption and meaningless opposition can be avoided: this is achieved by taking refuge in the "mountains", which, according to the scholar Robert Zaller, refers to "the ground of landscape itself and hence of access to the sublime".

The aloofness Jeffers recommends to his sons ties in with his philosophy of Inhumanism, which he would codify in the 1940s. His rejection of anthropocentrism is reflected in the final lines, which evoke Christianity's belief in God's incarnation as Christ, signifying a love for man that the poem dismisses as a "trap". The treatment of the relationship between nature, history, politics and family recurs in Jeffers' poems from the 1920s, notably in the narrative poems Tamar and The Women at Point Sur, and in the lyrical poem "Natural Music", which like "Shine, Perishing Republic" maintains that nature has the ability to redeem history.

== Publication ==
Jeffers omitted "Shine, Perishing Republic" from his 1924 collection Tamar and Other Poems. It was first published the year after in Roan Stallion, Tamar, and Other Poems, where it is part of the "Roan Stallion" grouping. It has frequently been anthologized, and is included in volumes of Jeffers' poetry such as Poems (1928), The Selected Poetry of Robinson Jeffers (1938), Robinson Jeffers: Selected Poems (1963), Rock and Hawk (1987) and The Wild God of the World (2003).

== Reception ==
The scholar George Hart wrote in 2001: "'Shine, Perishing Republic' stands as an example of Jeffers' free-verse poetics at their most muscular and vital. Against the experimentalism of his Modernist contemporaries, Jeffers demonstrates the power of rhetoric and direct statement to express complex emotion and political protest."

== Companion poems ==
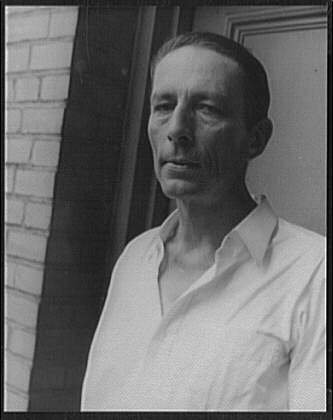
Jeffers in 1937

Jeffers wrote two companion pieces in the 1930s. "Shine, Republic" was read at the Library of Congress in an address on freedom. It was published in Scribner's Magazine in November 1935 and in Solstice and Other Poems from the same year. It is included in Selected Poems (1963) and Rock and Hawk (1987). "Shine, Empire", which references Franklin D. Roosevelt and Adolf Hitler, was written prior to the outbreak of World War II and published in Be Angry at the Sun and Other Poems (1941).

These two poems have not attained the same popularity as "Shine, Perishing Republic", but have provoked more controversy. The same naturalizing aloofness, applied in the original poem to the exuberance and decadence of the Jazz Age, is here targeted at the Great Depression and the approaching war, which has led to charges of cruelty and fascist sympathies.

== See also ==
- Crisis of the Roman Republic
- Cultural pessimism
