= Franz Douskey =

American writer

- Born: December 2, 1941
- Occupations: Poet; novelist; writer; teacher

Franz Douskey (born 2 December 1941) is an American writer. His work has been published in hundreds of magazines and anthologies, including The Nation, The New Yorker, Rolling Stone, Las Vegas Life, Yankee, USA/Today, The Georgia Review, The New York Times, Baseball Diamonds, and Yellow Silk. His first full-length book of poetry, Rowing Across the Dark, was published by the University of Georgia Press in 1982.

More recent work includes a 2011 collection of poetry, West of Midnight, published by the New York Quarterly Press and nominated twice for a Pulitzer Prize. Poet F. D. Reeve is quoted saying: "This astonishing collection sweeps from the America of 50 years ago to the one today. Though ruthless plutocrats have brought the nation to its fall, Douskey knows that ‘even in twilight the land simmers.’ ... This book of strong poetry stands out for its rich themes and its author's modest uprightness in a culture that thinks integrity is ‘an arcane idea.’ A wonderfully original, distinguished book that embraces our world."

In 2012, Douskey went in a different direction, collaborating with the late Tony Consiglio (Frank Sinatra's boyhood friend and longtime right-hand man) to create a collection of inside anecdotes and photographs that center on life with the "Rat Pack", and Sinatra in particular. The collection was published as a book and a CD titled Sinatra and Me: The Very Good Years. In 2014, Douskey's book, Elvis Is Out There was published and immediately went through two printings. Among its contents was a letter written by Sam C. Phillips, in 1996, praising Douskey's knowledge and appreciation of his life's work, and personal accounts of the lives of Memphis musicians. Douskey's co-written account of the adventures of internationally famous counterfeiter Louis "The Coin" Colavecchio, "You Thought it Was More", was published, in 2015.

Douskey has lived in Memphis, New Orleans, Tucson, and the West Indies. William Packard, editor of the New York Quarterly, listed Franz Douskey as a contemporary influential writer, along with James Dickey and Robert Penn Warren, with whom Douskey traveled from time to time (Read "Remembering James Dickey" in the New York Quarterly 61).

Douskey's version of the story of Chief Joseph was published in 1980 (in the Inland Boat Series), a few years before Robert Penn Warren's Chief Joseph of the Nez Perce was published (1983). While living in Memphis, Douskey became friends with Sam Phillips, the founder of Sun Records, who became an early mentor. Known in Memphis and Baltimore for his bluesy music, in the early 1960s Douskey performed under the name of T. L. Meade. With his group, The Tempters, played regularly at the Circus Club, the Carousel and the Band Box, in Baltimore, and toured briefly with Ben. E. King, Betty Everett, and The Mighty Sparrow (1965) in Kingston, Jamaica, St. Thomas, and finally at the Deauville Hotel, in Miami.

On December 2, 2015, Mark. Luttrell Jr., Mayor of Shelby County, Tennessee proclaimed "Franz Douskey Day", in honor of his music and writing, "who under his stage name T. L. Meade worked alongside Memphis music greats (Jerry Lee Lewis, Johnny Cash, Carl Perkins, Isaac Hayes and especially Sam C. Phillips) including far-reaching road shows to take the Memphis sound out into the world. Franz Douskey touched the soul of Memphis while he lived among us, and we appreciate his storytelling and contributions to the legend of Memphis music and culture." On December 16, 2015, Greg Harris, President of the Rock and Roll Hall of Fame, acknowledged Franz Douskey's long contribution to the history of Rock and Roll through his music and his writing, citing his historical novel Elvis is Out There as one example of Douskey's deep knowledge of music history and culture.

After his Rock and Roll years, Douskey traveled extensively in the 1960s before settling in Tucson. It was there that he met writers Richard Shelton, Edward Abbey, William Eastlake, Raymond Carver, Charles Bukowski, as well as publishers Jon and Gypsy Webb. Douskey and Bukowski carried on what has been described as a long, antagonistic relationship, which was refereed by William Packard, who published both Bukowski and Douskey in many issues of the New York Quarterly. Charles Bukowski and Franz Douskey have written about their ventures in New Orleans with Gypsy Lou and Jon Webb, but no book yet.

In Tucson the late 1960s, Douskey ran a "resistance-house" for draft dodging draftees heading for Canada, set up the Free University with Steve Mueller, and helped establish the Food Conspiracy, before moving east to work with the Black Panther Party. Because of Douskey's political activities and his nickname, "Duke", several Edward Abbey scholars concluded that Douskey was Abbey's model for George Washington Hayduke in The Monkey Wrench Gang. Franz Douskey appears in Wally Lamb's 2009 novel and 2014 movie Wishin' and Hopin' as Franz Duzio. Douskey is featured with Lyle Lovett and Michael Bolton in the movie "Pizza: A Love Story".

In the 1970s and 1980s, Douskey lived in Cornish, New Hampshire, near the equally reclusive J. D. Salinger. When Douskey would run into tourists anxious to ferret out Salinger, he would misdirect the intruders down a series of dirt roads that led them away from Salinger's house into nearby towns.

In his works, Douskey originated numerous neologisms, including "factitious": the complex piling on of erroneous facts based on a false premise (as in "We must go to war because there are weapons of mass destruction"); "fictoid": a brief lie hoping to pass as the truth (as in "I never had sex with that woman, Miss Lewinsky") the comically ponderous "irregardful", which is grammatically correct; and the astute observation that "Sequels never equal" (pg. 64 in The New Official Rules, edited by Paul Dickson). He also contributed to The Howard Stern Show (WNBC), and to Emeril Live! on the Food Network.

Franz Douskey has read from his works at hundreds of venues, including the University of Georgia, the Donnell Library (with F. D. Reeve), the Cronkite Graduate Center at Harvard, Yale University, Goddard College, New York University, in Albany, University of Arizona, and the New School of Social Research, among others. Recordings of early readings with Allen Ginsberg, who was a long-time friend and correspondent, are archived in the Ginsberg-Stanford University collection.

Douskey taught Creative Writing at Yale University for five years until 2001. In 2006, Douskey served as president of IMPAC University, in Punta Gorda, Florida. He also produced and co-hosted "Once Upon a Bandstand," a bi-weekly big-band radio show on WQUN, at Quinnipiac University from 2005-2012. An avid outdoorsman and publicist for the Giant Valley Polo Club, Franz Douskey currently resides in Hamden, CT., and at a second unknown address.

== Publishers ==
- The Nation
- The New Yorker
- The Georgia Review
- Rolling Stone
- USA/Today
- Yankee Magazine
- Down East
- Denver Quarterly
- The Minnesota Review
- Las Vegas Life
- The National Pastime
- New York Quarterly
- Chautauqua Review
- Chrysalis Reader
- Puerto Del Sol
- Callaloo
- Caprice
- American Literary Review
- Yellow Silk
- Puerto del Sol
- Simon & Schuster
- Doubleday
- Cavalier
- Sports Collectors Digest
- Grit
- University of Georgia Press and Inland Book Series
- Arizona State University
- Tantor Media
- Ice Box Press
- SINATRA & ME:The Very Good Years (Post Hill Press/Simon & Schuster, 2022)
