= Birds and Fishes =

Poem

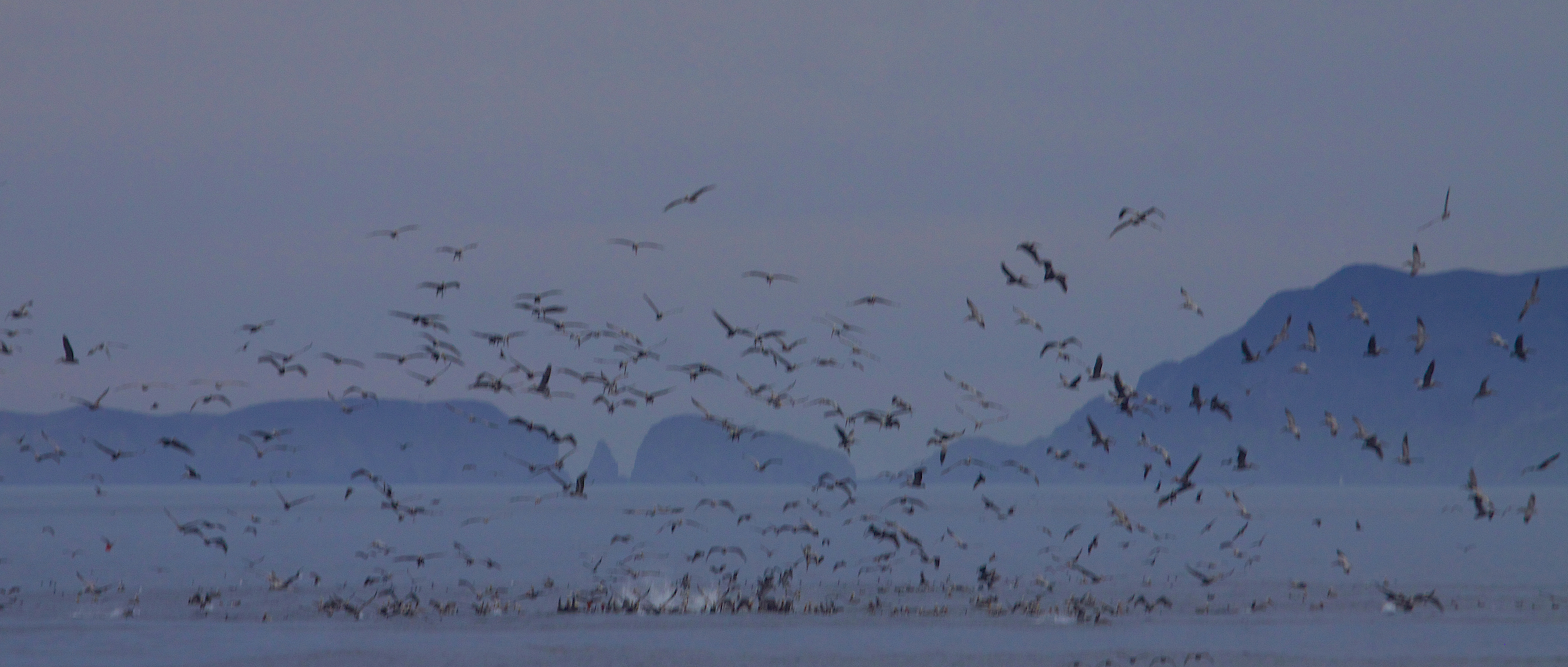
A feeding frenzy of mostly California brown pelicans and Heermann's gulls with Anacapa Island in the background

"Birds and Fishes" is a poem by the American and Californian writer Robinson Jeffers. It is included in The Beginning and the End and Other Poems, published posthumously in 1963.

== Summary ==
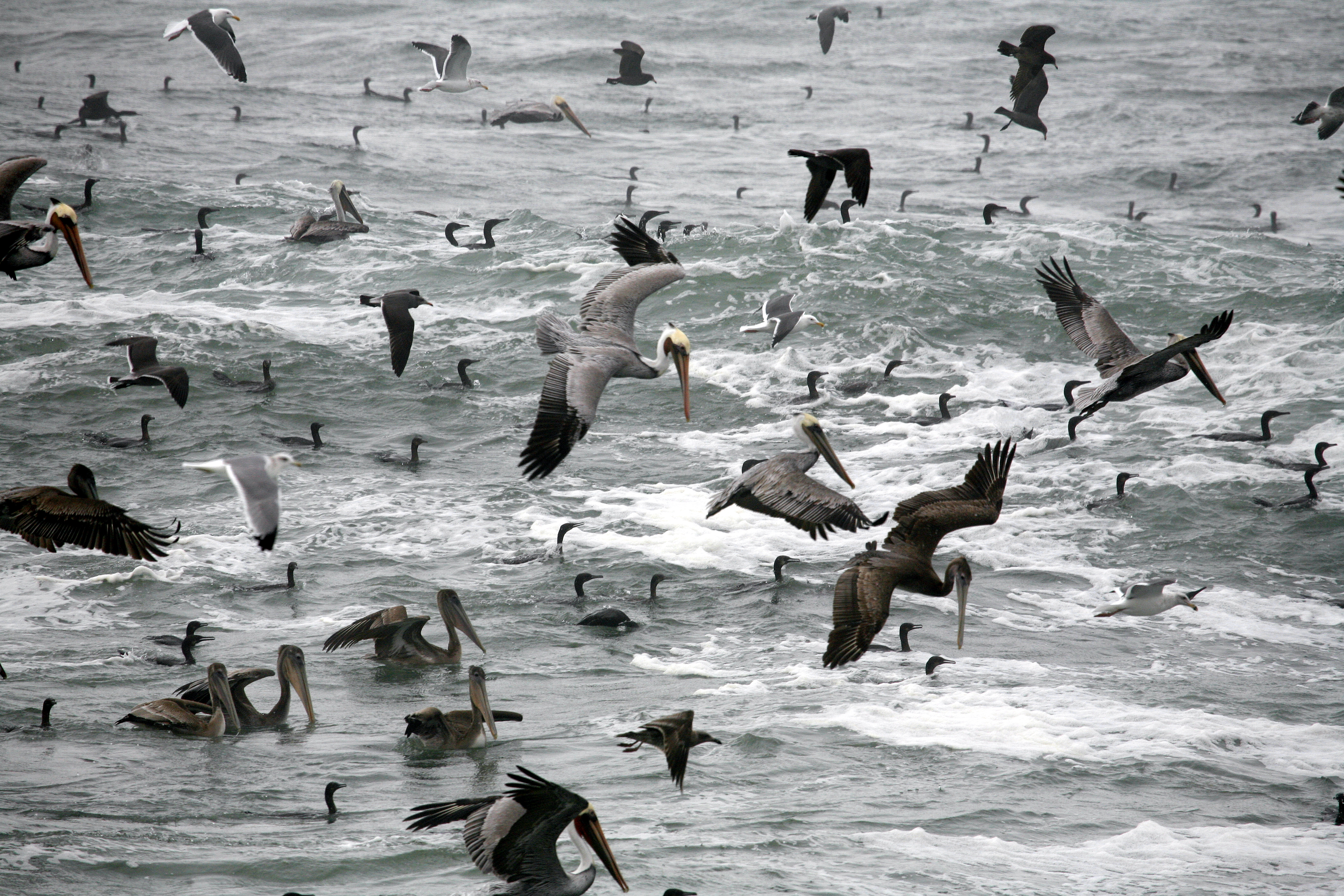
Cormorants and brown pelicans feeding in the Montaña de Oro State Park, California

Written in late 1954 or early 1955, the poem consists of 21 lines, of which the uneven lines generally have more syllables. It describes a yearly feeding frenzy in October, when fishes drawn to the shore attract large numbers of seabirds. The behavior of the birds is likened to a "witches' sabbath", "mob / Hysteria", and to humans "finding Gold in the street". The birds are attributed with envy, malice, greed, and a lack of pity for the fishes. The poet concludes that ideas of justice and mercy are concerns for neither animals nor God, and that life is characterized by hunger, terror and torment. He sees beauty in this. The quality of the scene described is not related to human concerns of "mercy", "mind" or "goodness", but to "the beauty of God".

== Themes ==
"Birds and Fishes" presents a clear example of how Jeffers viewed nature in his late nature poetry. In his early works, he expressed a worldview close to transcendentalism, and treated nature as a metaphor for human concerns. In the later works, humanity and human concerns are instead metaphors for nature. In "Birds and Fishes", the poet is ironic when he anthropomorphizes the feasting birds and attributes sins and hysteria to their behavior. Robert Zaller writes that "in the first part of 'Birds and Fishes', Jeffers almost presents a satiric account of what nature would look like if seen in terms of human behavior". In the concluding lines the irony is gone. The poem maintains that life on earth is not concerned with "justice and mercy", but reflects a harsh beauty. This is in line with the non-anthropocentric worldview which Jeffers had labeled inhumanism.

== Publication ==
"Birds and Fishes" appeared in 1963, the year after Jeffers died, as the concluding poem in the collection The Beginning and the End and Other Poems, published by Random House. The same year it also appeared in Robinson Jeffers: Selected Poems from Random House and Poetry in Crystal from Steuben Glass Works. In 1987, the poem was included in Random House's Rock and Hawk: A Selection of Shorter Poems by Robinson Jeffers.

== Glass sculpture ==
Poetry in Crystal was a collaboration between Steuben Glass and the Poetry Society of America where 31 artists were commissioned to create glass sculptures based on new poems. The writers were selected by the Poetry Society and received an honorarium of $250. Their identities were not revealed to the artists until afterwards. The commissions were made in 1961, and "Birds and Fishes" became the basis for a work with glass design by Donald Pollard and engraving design by Robert Vickrey. The collection was unveiled on April 18, 1963 at Steuben's gallery on Fifth Avenue in New York City, after which all the poems were published in a book with full-page photogravure images of the sculptures. The sculpture based on "Birds and Fishes" is in the collection of Sunnylands in Rancho Mirage, California.
