= The Man Upstairs =

The Man Upstairs may refer to:

== Books and literature ==
- The Man Upstairs (short story collection), a 1914 short story collection by P. G. Wodehouse
- "The Man Upstairs", a 1947 short story by Ray Bradbury from Dark Carnival
- The Man Upstairs, a 1953 play by Patrick Hamilton
- "The babysitter and the man upstairs", a 1960s urban legend
- The Man Upstairs, a 1995 short story by Carolyn Banks

== Film ==
- The Man Upstairs (1926 film), based on The Agony Column by Earl Derr Biggers
- The Man Upstairs (1958 film), starring Richard Attenborough
- The Man Upstairs (1992 film), starring Katharine Hepburn and Ryan O'Neal
- The Man Upstairs, a human character from The Lego Movie and The Lego Movie 2: The Second Part

== Music ==
- The Man Upstairs, a 2002 album by Richie Stephens
- The Man Upstairs (album), a 2014 album by Robyn Hitchcock

== Other uses ==
- God, when thought of as being in heaven above Earth
- Roommate
