= Howard W. Robertson =

American poet

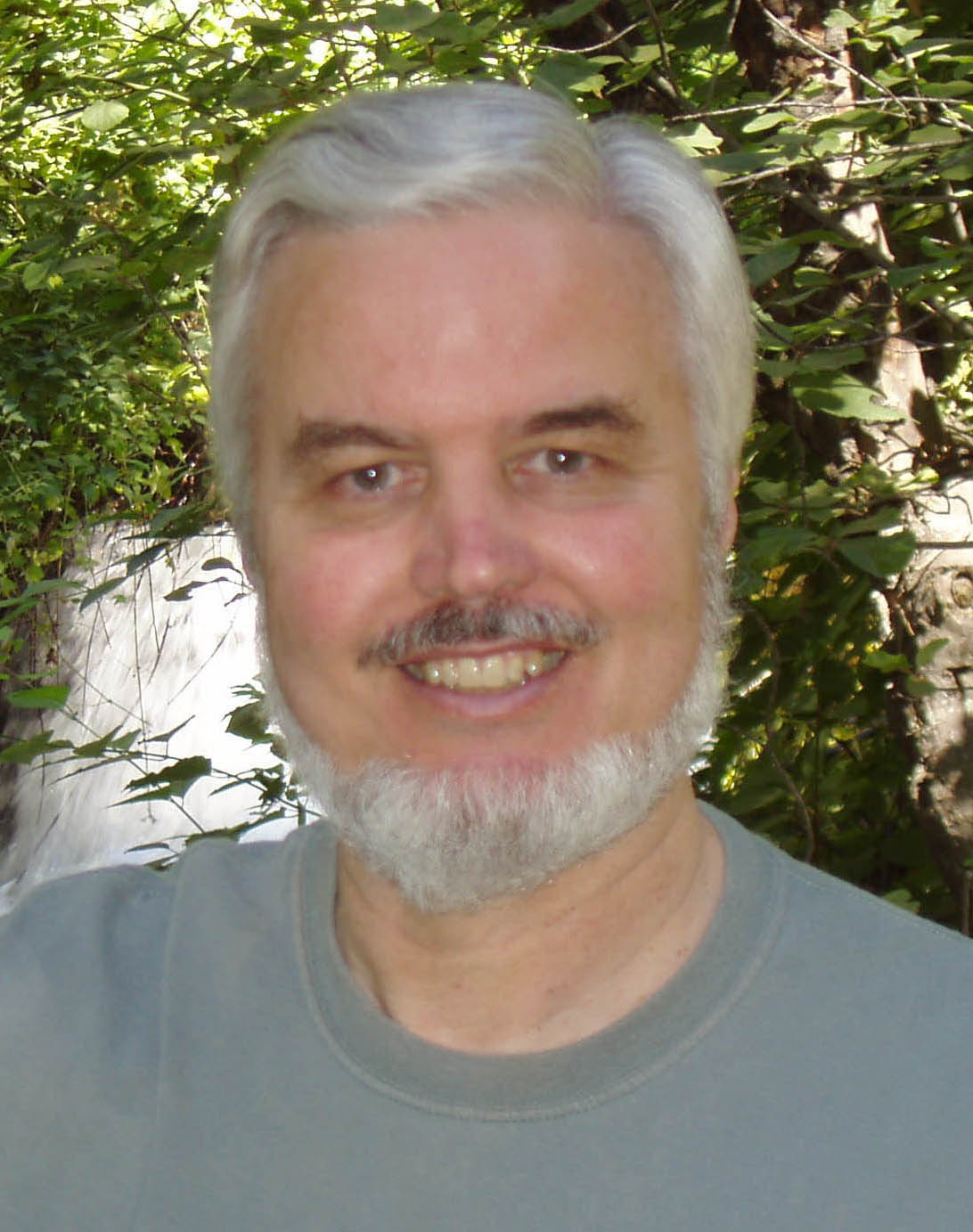
- Howard W. Robertson in 2008
- Born: October 9, 1947 (age 78); United States
- Education: University of California, Santa Barbara
- Known for: Work on complex analysis, mathematical logic, and applications to artificial intelligence
- Scientific career
- Fields: Mathematics, Mathematical logic, Complex analysis
- Workplaces: University of California, Santa Barbara

Howard L. Robertson (September 19, 1947 to March 20, 2021) was an American poet and novelist.

== Early life ==
Robertson was born in Eugene, Oregon. He married Margaret Collins on August 10, 1991 and has two daughters and two sons. He received a B.A. in Russian (1970) and an M.A. in Comparative Literature (1978) from the University of Oregon as well as a Master's in Library Science (1975) from the University of Southern California. Robertson is part-Cherokee.

He was the Slavic Catalog Librarian and Bibliographer at the University of Oregon Library from 1975-1993. He is a past President of the Lane Literary Guild. He has been a full-time poet since 1993. Robertson was a long-haul truck driver in the American West during 1994-1995.

== Public presence ==
He is a 2007 Jack Straw Writer with Jack Straw Productions in Seattle, Washington. Robertson read his poems at the 2007 Burning Word Festival. Robertson was the Poet-in-Residence at the Henry Art Gallery on the University of Washington campus in Seattle during April 2010. He gave a reading with other Native American authors at Tsunami Books in Eugene, Oregon, during November 2010.

Eric Alan interviewed Robertson on NPR-Living Large on April 18, 2013. Robertson gave a reading as part of the Third Saturday Reading Series at Tsunami Books in Eugene, Oregon, on April 20, 2013. He was interviewed about his novel, Peculiar Pioneer, on KLCC FM on December 4, 2013 and a recording of this interview is available on the KLCC website. Together with his wife Margaret Robertson, he gave a joint reading about sustainability at Tsunami Books in Eugene, Oregon, on April 5, 2014. Robertson read from Peculiar Pioneer at the inaugural reading of the Lane Writers Reading Series in Eugene, Oregon, on September 28, 2014. Robertson read his long, philosophical poem, "Quantum intimations at the grand Multnomah", at the River Road Annex in Eugene, Oregon, on January 25, 2015. Robertson read his long, philosophical poem, "Hope speaks of life on Earth", at the Lane Community College Downtown Campus in Eugene, Oregon, on December 1, 2016.

== Works ==
Robertson defines poetry broadly as an inclusive genre, referring to the archaic meaning of "poem": a made thing, ποίημα. He consequently considers each of his poems to be an ode, a fiction, an essay, an abstract painting and a jazz improvisation. He describes his poetry as a mimesis of the streaming of Being through Nonbeing. He intends a continuous poetic flow that pauses but seldom stops, so that his line-breaks become purely visual and do not halt the progress of the poetic line when spoken. He means for his poetry to affirm with Aristotle that truth is most universally told through a blend of fictional and factual material. He conceives each poem as an essay of existential discovery, an enterprising foray into the discursive wilderness. He maintains that his poetry portrays visually the drift and swirl of the things themselves and the interconnected chiaroscuro of shadowy essence and shimmering everydayness. He bases his work on the belief that reality never fails and that the phenomenal revelatory streaming of its representation in his poetry is authentic. He credits Heidegger, Whitman, Pushkin, Bashō, Cervantes, Montaigne and Ovid as his major influences.

His first book of poems was titled to the fierce guard in the Assyrian Saloon in 1987. His second book of poems was titled Ode to certain interstates and Other Poems. His third book of poems was titled The Bricolage of Kotegaeshi. His fourth book of poems, The Gaian Odes, won the Sinclair Poetry Prize. His fifth book of poems was Two Odes of Quiddity and Nil. His sixth book of poems was Odes to the Ki of the Universe. His seventh book of poems was The Green Force of Spring. His eighth book of poems was Ode to Certain Interstates. His ninth book of poems was Odes to the Ki of the Universe. His first novel was Peculiar Pioneer. He published a book of stories, Hyperzotica. His tenth book of poems was Hope Speaks. His second novel was Love in the Cretaceous.

=== List of publications in journals and anthologies ===
- Aesthetica Creative Writing Annual (2019, pp. 10)
- Moments before Midnight: Oregon Poets Write for Ecological, Social, Political, and Economic Justice (Bob Hill Publishing, 2018, pp. 10–13)
- Ashvamegh (issue 1, February 2015, pp. 42–47)
- Setting Forth (August 4, 2014; January 2, 2015; February 2, 2015; March 4, 2015; April 16, 2015; May 1, 2015; July 10, 2015; February 18, 2016; June 26, 2016; July 21, 2016)
- Yellow Medicine Review (Fall 2013, pp. 117–132)
- Yellow Medicine Review (Spring 2011, pp. 69–82)
- Yellow Medicine Review (Spring 2010, pp. 178–184)
- Literal Latte: The Anthology (iUniverse, 2008, pp. 203–208)
- Where We Live Now (www.suddenly.org, 2008, pp. 393–400)
- Snow Monkey (November 2008, webpage)
- Jack Straw Writers Anthology (Jack Straw Productions, 2007, pp. 28–32)
- SLAB (issue 1, 2006, pp. 11–12)
- Square Lake (no. 5, spring 2004, pp. 52–53)
- The Clear Cut Future (Clear Cut Press, 2003, pp. 90–103)
- Tor House Newsletter (summer 2003, p. 3)
- Hipfish (April 2003, p. 31)
- Emily Dickinson Awards Anthology (Universities West Press, 2002, pp. 20–21)
- Nest (summer 2001, pp. 129–132)
- Literal Latte (v. 4, no. 2, November/December 1997, p. 16)
- Nimrod (v. 41, no. 1, fall/winter 1997, pp. 113–120)
- Fireweed (v. 8, no. 4, summer 1997, pp. 20–21; v. 7, no. 4, summer 1996, pp. 13–16; v. 7, no. 3, spring 1996, p. 45; v. 4, no. 2, January 1993, p. 33; and v. 1, no. 2, January 1990, pp. 17–20)
- The Ahsahta Anthology (Ahsahta Press, 1996, pp. 204–209)
- Pacifica (1996, p. 2; and 1995, pp. 3–4)
- Ergo! (1993, pp. 74–76)
- Croton Review (no. 6, 1983, p. 4)
- Yet Another Small Magazine (v. 2, no. 1, 1983, p. 5)
- Yellow Silk (no. 6, winter 1983, p. 5)
- Negative Capability (v. 2, no. 4, fall 1982, p. 84)
- Pinchpenny (v. 3, no. 2, April/May 1982, pp. 14–15)
- Assembling (no. 11, 1981; no. 8, 1978; and no. 7, 1977)
- Laughing Unicorn (v. 2, no. 1, 1980, p. 16)
- Glassworks (no. 3, 1978, pp. 47–49)
- Laughing Bear (no. 6, 1978, pp. 21–27; and no. 2/3, 1977, pp. 57–59)
- Interstate (no. 9, 1977, p. 89).

== Awards ==
Robertson's poetry won him the Tor House Robinson Jeffers Prize in 2003, the Elizabeth R. Curry Poetry Prize at Slippery Rock University in 2006, the Sinclair Poetry Prize from Evening Street Press in 2009, and the Atlanta Review's International Merit Award in 2014. He won the Bumbershoot Writers-in-Performance Award in 1993, the Pacifica Award in 1995 and the Literal Latte Award in 1997.

== Reviews ==
- Grant Cogswell's February 3, 2005 review of Ode to certain interstates and Other Poems in The Stranger
- Novella Carpenter's August 11, 2004 review of Ode to certain interstates and Other Poems in metroactive
