= Howard Robertson =

Howard Robertson may refer to:

- Howard Robertson (architect) (1888–1963), architect of the Shell Centre
- Howard P. Robertson (1903–1961), American mathematician
- Howard W. Robertson (born 1947), American poet
