= James Squires =

James Squires may refer to:

- James Squire (1754–1822), or Squires, convict transported to Australia and brewer
- James A. Squires, American railroad executive
- James Radcliffe Squires (1917–1993), American poet, writer, critic, and academic
