= Raymond P. Hammond =

American poet

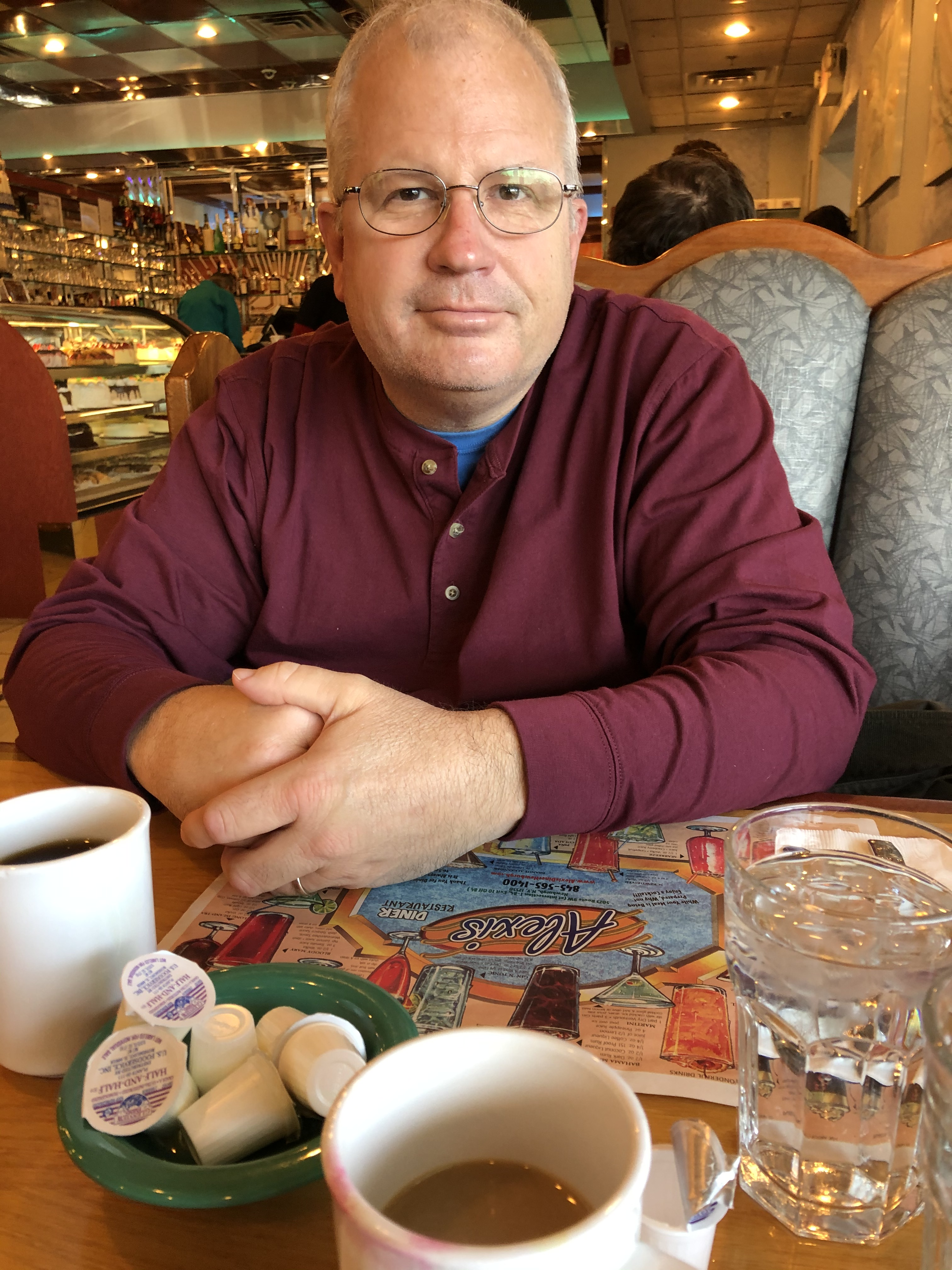
Raymond at Alexis Diner in Newburgh, New York

Raymond P. Hammond is an American poet, critic and editor of the New York Quarterly magazine since assuming control after the death of William Packard in 2002.

Hammond was born August 31, 1964, in Roanoke, Virginia. Packard had "willed" the magazine by asking Hammond in writing to take control of the magazine should anything happen to him.

Hammond is the author of Poetic Amusement. Originally written in 2000 as his Master's thesis, Poetic Amusement was passed around underground as a digital file for ten years among those associated with the New York Quarterly. What began as Hammond's observations of the influence of "po' biz" and writing programs on contemporary American poetry became a timeless treatise on poetry itself. Using his experience with NYQ and devouring many literary critics across the ages from the ancient Greeks to contemporary critics, Hammond examines at once both our current literary environment and the essence of poetry. In seeking to answer the questions "What is poetry?" and "Where does poetry come from?" for himself, he encourages readers to ask those questions for and of themselves as well.

== See also ==
- New York Quarterly Website
- Raymond P. Hammond Website
- NYQ Editor Speaks on Editorial Voice

== Review of Poetic Amusement ==
- American Book Review Volume 32, Number 4, May/June 2011 on Project Muse

== Interviews ==
- Interview: Raymond Hammond of The New York Quarterly in The Abbeville Manual of Style, August 11, 2008
- Meet the Press: Nin Andrews interviews Raymond Hammond, editor of NYQ Books and The New York Quarterly in The Best American Poetry Blog, December 11, 2010
- Guest Interview: Melanie Huber Speaks With New York Quarterly Editor Raymond Hammond in Savvy Verse & Wit, March 4, 2011
- A Poetry Editor Reveals the Secrets of the Trade: Raymond Hammond on How to Fix the Current Poetry Paradigm, Huffington Post, December 11, 2011
