= List of people from Whittier, California =

The following is a list of people who were born in or lived in the city of Whittier, California

== Entertainment ==
- Gary Allan (born Gary Allan Herzberg), country music artist, graduated La Serna High School
- Antagonist, metal band signed to Prosthetic Records
- Andrea Barber, actress (Full House)
- Caprice Bourret, supermodel
- Cold War Kids, indie rock band
- Pete Dee Davison, musician (The Adicts)
- Joy Enriquez, singer, actress (7th Heaven)
- Funeral Party, punk/rock band
- William Garwood, actor and director of early silent films in the 1910s
- David Hidalgo, musician (Los Lobos)
- Kathy Hilton, actress, socialite, mother of Paris and Nicky Hilton
- Gabriel Iglesias, comedian and actor
- Vic "the Brick" Jacobs, radio personality
- Adrienne Janic, co-host of Overhaulin', model, and Fanta Girl
- Mark Kostabi, composer and artist
- Paul Kostabi, artist, musician, and producer
- John Alan Lasseter, Academy Award–winning animator and Chief Creative Officer at Pixar and Walt Disney Animation Studios
- Roger Lodge, actor (host of Blind Date)
- Long Gone John, founder of Sympathy for the Record Industry
- Martika, singer
- Tim Minear, screenwriter, director
- Roger Mobley, child actor, moved to Whittier in 1957
- Lorna Patterson, actress
- Merle Pertile, Playboy Playmate, January 1962
- Vaneza Leza Pitynski, actress (The Brothers Garcia)
- Chuck Prophet, musician (solo artist and founder of the band Green On Red)
- Dax Reynosa, hip hop and smooth jazz artist and producer, music manager, and film producer
- Zane Reynosa, hip hop artist and fashion accessory designer
- Ron Shelton, director, screenwriter (Bull Durham, White Men Can't Jump, Tin Cup)
- Eric Stoltz, actor (Memphis Belle, Jerry Maguire, Pulp Fiction)
- Geoff Stults, actor (7th Heaven)
- Lauren Tewes, actress (The Love Boat)
- Tom Waits, actor, singer-songwriter
- Tina Yothers, actress (Family Ties)
- Michael Sweet musician, Christian rock band (Stryper)
- Robert Sweet musician, Christian rock band (Stryper)
- Oz Fox musician, Christian rock band (Stryper)

== Arts and literature ==
- Horace Bristol, photographer, Life Magazine
- Firoozeh Dumas, author
- Christine Dzidrums, author
- M.F.K. Fisher, author
- Dave Freeman, author
- Mark Kostabi, painter, left Whittier to be discovered in New York
- Paul Kostabi, artist, musician, and producer
- Carol Lay, artist
- Thom Mayne, Pritzker Prize-winning architect
- Craig McCracken, animator
- Tim Miller, performance artist (member of the NEA Four)
- Cherríe Moraga, poet, essayist, playwright
- Joe Ranft - animator, storyboard artist
- Nicole Stansbury, author
- Diane Wakoski, poet
- X-8, artist, publisher

== Government ==
- George Allen, United States Senator (Virginia)
- Louis Caldera, United States Secretary of the Army
- Ronald B. Cameron, Congressman
- Raymond F. Chandler, Sergeant Major of the Army, first enlisted commandant of United States Army Sergeants Major Academy
- James Ferguson, Air Force General
- Jacob F. Gerkens - first chief of the LAPD
- Gabriel Green, write-in presidential candidate
- Lou Henry Hoover, wife of Herbert Hoover and First Lady of the United States
- Gary Miller, Republican U.S. Representative for California's 31st congressional district. Miller grew up in Whittier.
- Pat Nixon, First Lady, wife of President Richard Nixon
- Richard Nixon, 37th President of the United States, played football at Whittier High School and Whittier College
- Pío Pico, last Mexican governor of Alta California
- Anthony Rendon, assemblyman representing California's 63rd State Assembly district
- James C. Riley, US Army lieutenant general
- Linda Sánchez, Democratic U.S. Representative for California's 38th congressional district

== Sports ==
- Deborah Babashoff, swimmer
- Shirley Babashoff, Olympic gold medalist swimmer
- Chet Brewer, Negro league baseball player
- George Buehler, football player
- Mitchell Callahan, hockey player
- Chuck Cary, baseball player
- Bob Chandler, football player
- Dave Dalby, football player, center, Oakland Raiders
- Oscar De La Hoya, Olympic and professional boxing champion
- Andy Etchebarren, baseball player (last man to bat against Sandy Koufax)
- Vince Evans, football quarterback
- Arturo Frias, boxing champion
- Michael Garciaparra, baseball player
- Nomar Garciaparra, baseball player
- Greg Hancock, speedway champion
- Payton Jordan, coach of 1968 U.S. Olympic track and field
- Mark Kotsay, baseball player
- Dan Owens, football player
- Jamie Quirk, baseball player
- Ante Razov, soccer player
- Anthony Reyes, baseball player
- Kim Rhode, Olympic gold medalist, (double trap and skeet shooter)
- Mark Sanchez, football quarterback, Philadelphia Eagles
- Art Sherman (born 1937), horse trainer and jockey
- Adam Snyder, football player, San Francisco 49ers
- Jenny Topping, Olympic gold medalist, softball
- Aaron Valdes (born 1993), basketball player in the Israeli Basketball Premier League
- Al Young, drag racing World Champion & award winning high school teacher
- Jim Zorn, football quarterback, former coach Washington Redskins
- Eddie Zosky, baseball player
- Jared Jones, baseball player

== Miscellaneous ==
- Milo Burcham, aviator, test pilot
- Tricia Nixon Cox - daughter of President Nixon
- Francis A. and Hannah Nixon, parents of President Nixon
- John Quijada, linguist, constructed language expert
- Nadya Suleman, mother of the Suleman octuplets (born January 26, 2009)
- Kerry Thornley, founder of Discordianism
