= Hamilton Jeffers =

American astronomer (1893–1976)

Minor planets discovered: 1
(58093) 1934 JP	9 May 1934	MPC^{[1]}
^{1} discovered at Lick Observatory, Mount Hamilton, USA

Hamilton Moore Jeffers (13 October 1893 – 28 May 1976) was a noted American astronomer and discoverer of (58093) 1934 JP, an asteroid from the inner regions of the asteroid belt. The main-belt asteroid 1934 Jeffers was named in his honor in February 1976 (M.P.C. 3938).

== Early life and education ==
Jeffers was born in Sewickley, Pennsylvania, to Presbyterian minister William Hamilton Jeffers, and Annie Robinson Tuttle (a woman 23 years younger than her husband). His elder brother Robinson Jeffers would become a noted poet.

He was graduated from the University of California, Berkeley in 1917, and received a doctorate in astronomy from the same institution in 1921. As a graduate student, he was particularly noted at the university's Lick Observatory for the quality of his cometary observations.

== Career ==
In February 1921, he made instructor of astronomy at the State University of Iowa, and remained so for slightly less than three years. In 1924, he became an assistant astronomer at the Lick Observatory, where he remained until his retirement in 1961, with the exception of the period of 1941 to 1945, during which he took leave to contribute to the war effort. In 1933, he became an Associate Astronomer; and in 1938 he became a full astronomer.

Jeffers was noted for the accuracy and precision of his work, which included extensive observations of double stars.

During the war years, Jeffers served first at the Radiation Laboratory of the Massachusetts Institute of Technology, and then as an operations analyst in Alaska and in India. Jeffers married his wife Bobbe in 1950. Upon retirement, Jeffers was made astronomer emeritus at the Lick Observatory. He retired to Carmel Highlands.

== Bibliography ==
- Shane, C.D.; “Obituary – Jeffers, Hamilton-Moore”, Royal Astronomical Society Quarterly Journal v. 21 (1980), p. 69.
