= Yellow Silk =

American magazine published 1981–1996

Yellow Silk: Journal of Erotic Arts was a magazine founded by writer, editor, and designer Lily Pond and published quarterly from 1981 to 1996 on the belief that the erotic should play a more visible role in American arts and letters. The magazine promoted the idea of erotic energy being not only sexual desire but love of any kind. The publisher was Three Rivers Press and the magazine was based in Rhode Island.

== Anthologies ==
Works published in this magazine were anthologized in:

- Yellow Silk: Erotic Arts and Letters, Three Rivers Press, 1992, ISBN 0-517-58736-X, edited by Lily Pond and Richard Russo (AKA Richard A. Russo, not the novelist of the same name)
- The Book of Eros: Arts and Letters from Yellow Silk, Three Rivers Press, 1996, ISBN 0-517-88612-X
- Seven Hundred Kisses: A Yellow Silk Book of Erotic Writing, HarperOne, 1997, ISBN 0-06-251484-9
- Yellow Silk II: International Erotic Stories and Poems , Grand Central Publishing ISBN 978-0-446-67531-4

Editor Lily Pond also published Pillow: Exploring the Heart of Eros (A Yellow Silk Book), Celestial Arts, 1998, ISBN 0-89087-858-7

== Contributors ==
Yellow Silk has showcased the work of a long list of notable writers and artists. Authors who have appeared in Yellow Silk include: Kim Addonizio, Angela Ball, Carolyn Banks, Robert Bly, Angela Carter, Marilyn Chin, Wanda Coleman, Franz Douskey, Margaret Drabble, Anita Endrezze, Louise Erdrich, Susan Griffin, Marilyn Hacker, Jane Hirshfield, Ha Jin, Galway Kinnell, William Kotzwinkle, Dorianne Laux, Mary Mackey, David Mamet, Carole Maso, W.S. Merwin, Bharati Mukherjee, Dennis Nurkse, Sharon Olds, Mary Oliver, Jennifer Jean O'Neill, Octavio Paz, Marge Piercy, Howard W. Robertson, Andrew Schelling, Ntozake Shange, Robert Silverberg, Nicole Stansbury, Terry Tempest Williams, and Robert Wrigley.

Artists and photographers who provided covers and interior illustrations, typically a single artist per issue, include: Sigmund Abeles, Tee Corinne, Judy Dater, Betty LaDuke, Mayumi Oda, Stephen John Phillips, Jan Saudek, and Maurianna Nolan (Winkler).
