= Anthony Reyes =

American baseball player (born 1981)

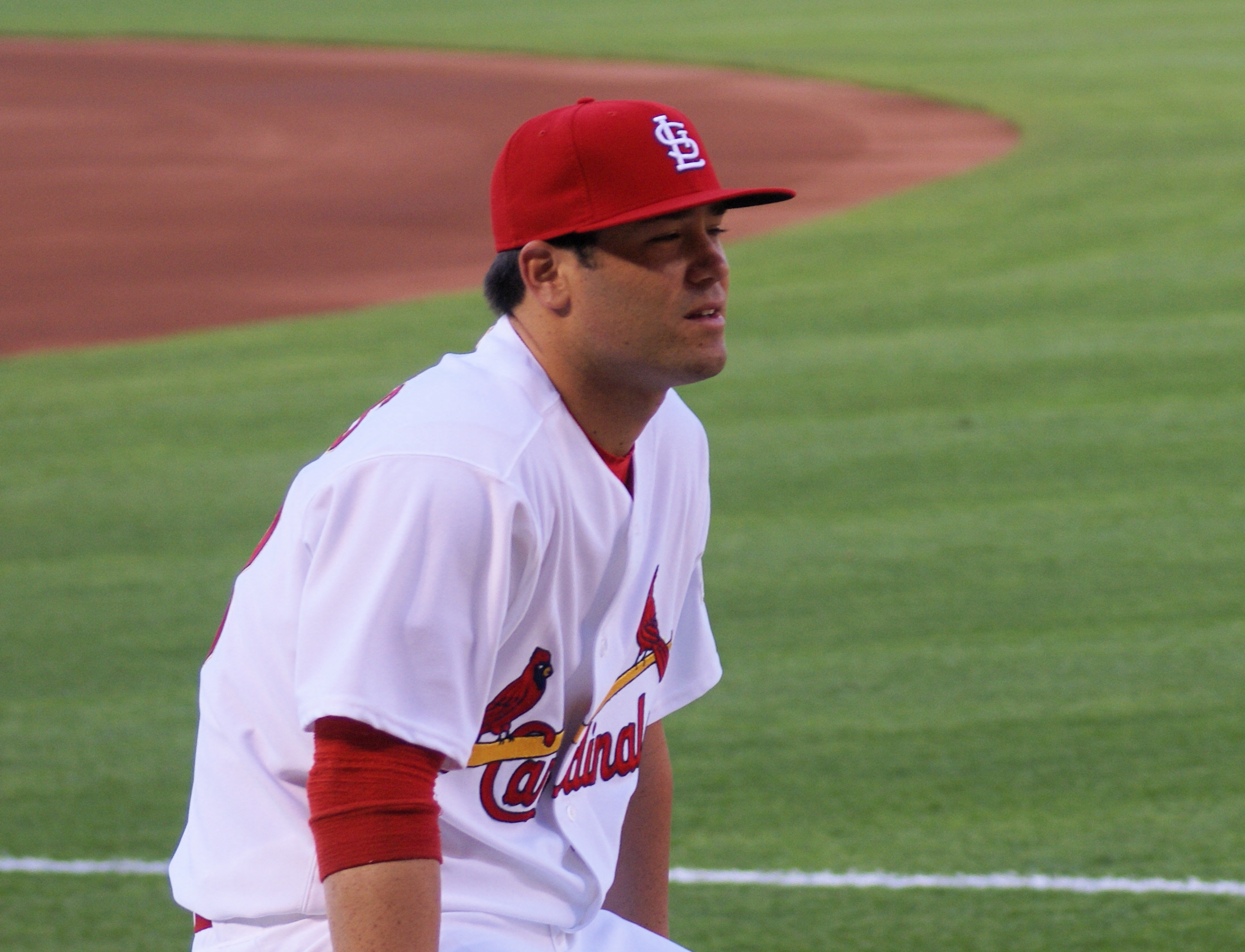
- Reyes with the St. Louis Cardinals
- Pitcher
- Born: October 16, 1981 (age 44); Whittier, California, U.S.
- Batted: Right Threw: Right

MLB debut
- August 9, 2005, for the St. Louis Cardinals

Last MLB appearance
- May 22, 2009, for the Cleveland Indians

MLB statistics
- Win–loss record: 13–26
- Earned run average: 5.12
- Strikeouts: 205
- Stats at Baseball Reference

Teams
- St. Louis Cardinals (2005–2008); Cleveland Indians (2008–2009)

Career highlights and awards
- World Series champion (2006)

Anthony Loza Reyes (born October 16, 1981) is an American former professional baseball pitcher who played five seasons in Major League Baseball (MLB). He pitched primarily as a starting pitcher for the St. Louis Cardinals and Cleveland Indians. Reyes attended the University of Southern California (USC), before the Cardinals selected him in the 15th round of the 2003 MLB draft, and made his major league debut on August 9, 2005. During his playing career, Reyes threw and batted right-handed, stood 6 feet 2 inches (1.88 m) tall, and weighed 230 pounds (100 kg).

A native of Whittier, California, Reyes became the Cardinals' top prospect in their minor league system. As a rookie, he was a member of the Cardinals' 2006 World Series championship team, including starting Game 1. Following his playing career, he became a firefighter for the Los Angeles County Fire Department.

== High school ==
Reyes attended California High School in Whittier, California. Once considered too small to be a pitcher, Reyes went 7–1 with a 1.61 ERA as a senior, earning Del Rey League Co-Pitcher of the Year honors. He goes back to California High during the off season to practice and stays in touch with the coaches.

== College career ==
Reyes spent his college years at the University of Southern California from 2000 to 2003, and though he was selected by the Detroit Tigers in the 13th round (380th overall) of the 2002 Major League Baseball draft, he elected to return to school for his senior year. He was on several USC teams with San Diego Padres pitcher Mark Prior. In four seasons with the Trojans, Reyes compiled a 17–16 record and earned Pac-10 honors three times.

== Professional career ==
Reyes was drafted in the 15th round (455th overall) by the St. Louis Cardinals in the 2003 Major League Baseball draft. He made his professional debut in 2004 with the Single-A Palm Beach Cardinals, where he compiled a 3–0 record with a 4.66 ERA in seven starts. Reyes was later promoted to the Double-A Tennessee Smokies, where he achieved a 6–2 record with a 3.03 ERA in 12 starts. Reyes was eventually considered the top prospect in the St. Louis farm system.

Reyes began the 2005 season with the Triple-A Memphis Redbirds. In 23 starts, he was 7–6 with a 3.64 ERA. In August, Reyes' contract was purchased by the Cardinals. On August 9, at Miller Park, Reyes made his major league debut, throwing 6 1/3 innings against the Milwaukee Brewers, earning the win and giving up just two runs on two hits. He was demoted immediately after the game, having fulfilled his role of giving the regular rotation an extra day's rest by manager Tony La Russa. Reyes was recalled again on September 5 when the rosters expanded to 40. In four total appearances (one start) with the Cardinals, he was 1–1 with a 2.70 ERA.

Once again, Reyes opened the 2006 season with Memphis. He was recalled to St. Louis on June 21, and was placed in their starting rotation. On June 22, Reyes was asked to start the final game of a three-game series against the Chicago White Sox. In the previous two games, the White Sox scored 33 runs against the Cardinals. In the third game, Reyes threw 90 pitches, 67 for strikes, had six strikeouts and no walks, and carried a no-hitter into the seventh inning. The only White Sox hit was a home run by Jim Thome. The Cardinals offense could not respond in kind and the White Sox won, 1–0. Reyes pitched an eight-inning complete game and took the loss despite giving up only the one hit (albeit a home run) to Thome. Reyes made 17 starts in 2006, going 5–8 with a 5.06 ERA and 72 strikeouts in 85 1/3 innings pitched.

During the Cardinals' 2006 playoff run, Reyes was left off the roster for the National League Division Series against the San Diego Padres. However, after advancing to the National League Championship Series against the New York Mets, the Cardinals added him to the roster in place of starting pitcher Jason Marquis. Reyes started Game 4 of the series and pitched four innings, allowing two earned runs on three hits and four walks, taking a no-decision in the 12–5 loss. He then started Game 1 of the 2006 World Series against fellow rookie Justin Verlander and earned the win, pitching eight innings and retiring 17 consecutive batters from the first through the sixth inning; a World Series record for a rookie. Reyes gave up two runs and earned player of the game honors. The Cardinals went on to win the series, defeating the Detroit Tigers four games to one.

After starting the 2007 season 0–8 with a 6.08 ERA in nine starts (although he had the worst run support in the majors), the Cardinals optioned him to Memphis on May 27. Todd Wellemeyer replaced him in the Cardinals starting rotation. He made three strong starts for the Redbirds and was recalled to St. Louis June 16, but was optioned back to Memphis again on July 2. On July 28, Reyes was called up again from Memphis to make a spot start in a doubleheader against Milwaukee. He pitched well, allowing two runs on two hits in six innings to earn his first win of the season. Reyes finished the season with a 2–14 record and a 6.04 ERA in 22 games (20 starts).

Reyes began the 2008 season in St. Louis's bullpen, going 2–1 with one save and a 4.91 ERA in 10 relief appearances. On May 4, he was optioned to Triple-A Memphis. He went 2–3 with a 3.25 ERA in 11 starts at Memphis.

On July 26, 2008, Reyes was traded to the Cleveland Indians for right-handed reliever Luis Perdomo and cash. He was immediately assigned to the Triple-A Buffalo Bisons, where he went 2–0 with a 2.77 ERA in two starts.

On August 8, 2008, the Indians promoted Reyes from Buffalo. That same day, he made his first start for Cleveland, going 6 1/3 innings, allowing just one run on seven hits, and picked up the win. On September 6, Reyes exited his start after three innings against the Kansas City Royals due to a sore right elbow. He was later shut down for the rest of the season on September 16. In six starts with Cleveland, Reyes was 2–1 with a 1.83 ERA.

Reyes started the 2009 season as a member of Cleveland's starting rotation. He struggled in eight starts, going 1–1 with a 6.57 ERA. On May 22 against the Cincinnati Reds, Reyes was limited to three innings due to elbow inflammation. He was placed on the disabled list the next day. On June 10, 2009, it was announced that Reyes would undergo season-ending elbow surgery.

Reyes was non-tendered by the Indians on December 12, 2009, making him a free agent. He was re-signed to a minor league contract on December 13. During spring training his contract was purchased by the Indians, at which time he was placed on the 60-day disabled list, while recovering from Tommy John surgery. After spending the entire 2010 season on the disabled list, Reyes was outrighted to the Triple-A Columbus Clippers on October 29, 2010. After electing free agency, Reyes signed a minor league contract with the Indians on November 15. His contract included a non-roster invitation to the Indians' 2011 spring training camp.

Reyes spent the 2011 season rehabbing his injured elbow, never appearing on the 40-man roster. He was released by the Indians on August 5, 2011.

On May 7, 2012, Reyes signed a minor league contract with the San Diego Padres. He became a free agent following the season on November 3, and subsequently retired.

== Personal life ==
Reyes has a younger brother, Erik, who pitched for Concordia University Irvine in 2007.

Reyes became a Los Angeles County firefighter in March 2017, and was pressed into action to combat the wildfires in California later that year.

== See also ==
- List of people from Whittier, California
