= Cawdor (poem) =

Poem by Robinson Jeffers

Cawdor is a narrative poem by Robinson Jeffers. In 1909 Big Sur, a desperate young woman named Fera, trying to save her father, agrees to marry a much older man named Cawdor only to fall for that man’s son, Hood, sending the two men on a deadly trajectory of jealousy and confusion.

Though rooted in the landscape and the lore of Big Sur, Jeffers draws on many mythic and literary sources to construct Cawdor. Its title evokes Shakespeare's Macbeth, the Thane of Cawdor, but its plot is based on Euripides' tragedy Hippolytus. According to Jeffers biographer James Karman:

Cawdor's story, set within the rugged terrain of Big Sur, unfolds as a convincing local tragedy. The plot itself, however, derives from Greek mythology, where Phaedra provokes her husband Theseus to kill his son Hippolytus because of the latter's unwillingness to make love to her. Desire, rejection, and false accusation also factor into the biblical story of Joseph and Potiphar's wife. Other associations include Cawdor's name, which links him to Macbeth, Thane of Cawdor; his violent, manipulated jealousy, which links him to Othello; his self-inflicted blindness, prefigured in the act of Oedipus; and, in the case of Hood, a wound in the thigh that connects him to Attis and the priests of Cybele.

== Film Adaptation ==
Cawdor a Fera is 1985 Czechoslovak TV movie based on the poem. It was directed by Jiří Adamec.
