= New York Quarterly =

American poetry magazine

- Editor: Raymond P. Hammond
- Former editors: William Packard
- Frequency: Quarterly (4x annually)
- Founded: 1969
- Country: United States
- Based in: New York City, NY
- Language: English
- Website: nyq.org

The New York Quarterly (NYQ) is a popular contemporary American poetry magazine. Established by William Packard (1933-2002) in 1969, Rolling Stone magazine has called the NYQ "the most important poetry magazine in America".

== History ==
After the death of William Packard in 2002, Raymond P. Hammond assumed control of the magazine.

== Content ==
The NYQ was widely known for featuring poems and/or interviews with writers such as Carol Jennings, Charles Bukowski, W. H. Auden, Anne Sexton, Ted Kooser, Franz Wright, Karl Shapiro, Macdonald Carey, Richard Eberhart, Michael McClure, Robert Peters (writer) and Lyn Lifshin. The magazine also regularly published work by emerging authors.

== See also ==
- List of literary magazines
