= Carolyn Banks =

American writer

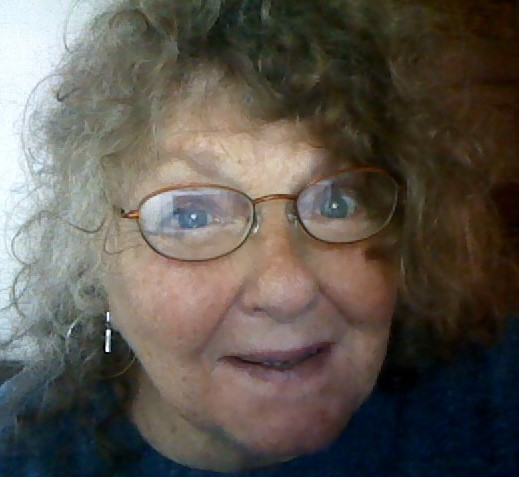
- Born: February 9, 1941 (age 85)
- Occupations: Novelist; short-story writer; screenwriter
- Writing career
- Language: English
- Genres: Mystery; erotic; humor

Carolyn Banks (born February 9, 1941) is an American novelist, short-story writer, editor, and screenwriter residing in Bastrop, Texas.

== Writing career ==
=== 20th century ===
Her first national publication was her short story "Idyll," which appeared in Voyages,} a literary magazine, in 1968, alongside the work of Anaïs Nin, Josephine Miles and Theodore Weiss. In 1972, the oft-reprinted "Growing Up Polish in Pittsburgh" appeared in American Mix (Lippincott). A version of this story appeared as "The Virgin of Polish Hill" in Plume's 1992 Catholic Girls. Her stories appeared in several issues of Yellow Silk.

Her first novel, Mr. Right (Viking), appeared in 1979. Cosmopolitan called the novel "...a triumph of erotic and witty narrative tension with an impact as startling as it is satisfying." The book was reprinted by The Permanent Press in 1999.

Mr. Right was followed by The Darkroom (Viking, 1980), The Girls on the Row (Crown, 1983) and Patchwork (Crown, 1986).

Her short stories continued to appear in anthologies, notably Michele Slung's I Shudder at Your Touch (HarperCollins, 1992) and Slow Hand (HarperCollins).

In the 1990s Banks wrote a series of comic mysteries set in the equestrian world of dressage, a competitive sport that Banks herself practiced. These novels, originally published by Fawcett and reprinted by Amber Quill Press include: Death by Dressage, Groomed for Death, Death on the Diagonal, Murder Well Bred and A Horse to Die For.

=== 21st century ===
In 2007, Amber Quill also reprinted a 1995 literary novel Banks wrote entitled The Turtle's Voice. The novel won the 1995 Austin Book Award. Her most recent novel is "The Importance of Being Erica." Banks calls it a farcical novel. It features Oscar Wilde and Bram Stoker. In September, 2025, Running Wild Press will publish "The Death Knot," a thriller.

Banks is listed in Contemporary Authors, Vol. 105 and is a member of Author's Guild and the Texas Institute of Letters.

In 2001, Banks co-founded a nonprofit organization called Upstart, Inc., a media arts organization that organises experts to teach screenwriting, production and post-production, and which runs the local public access cable television station, Bastrop Community Access Television. As a result of this, Banks started writing scripts and producing short movies including "Dead On" and "Bastrop: The First 175 Years," which won Best Documentary at a 2007 South Texas film festival. From 2014 to 2022, Banks taught English for Austin Community College.

In 2009, Banks wrote and directed the comic-horror feature film, Invicta. In 2011, the Austin Film Society awarded Banks a grant from the Texas Filmmakers Production Fund to complete her short comedy, "Sex and the Septuagenarian."

== Bibliography ==
=== Novels ===
- Mr. Right (1979, reprinted 1999)
- The Darkroom (1980, reprinted 2014)
- The Girls on the Row (1983)
- Patchwork (1986)
- Death by Dressage (1993)
- Groomed for Death (1995)
- Murder Well Bred (1995)
- The Turtle's Voice (1995, reprinted 2007)
- Death on the Diagonal (1996)
- A Horse to Die For (1996)
- The Importance of Being Erica (2013)
- The Death Knot (2025)

=== Short stories ===
- Tart Tales: Elegant Erotic Stories (1993)

=== Anthologies ===
- Catholic Girls: Stories, Poems, and Memoirs (1992)
- I Shudder at Your Touch (1991)
- Slow Hand (1992)
- Full Frontal Fiction (2000)
- Chick-Lit: Postfeminist Fiction (1995), first use of genre term Chick Lit
- Gargoyle (2014)

=== Books edited ===
- A Loving Voice: A Caregiver's Book of Read-Aloud Stories for the Elderly (1992, coeditor with Janis Rizzo)
- A Loving Voice II: A Caregiver's Book of More Read-Aloud Stories for the Elderly (1994, coeditor)

== Filmography ==
- Invicta (2009, feature)
- A Child's Christmas in Texas (2010, short)
- Sex and the Septuagenarian (2011, short)
- The Fire (2013, feature-length documentary about the 2011 Bastrop County wildfires)
