= James Radcliffe Squires =

American poet

Radcliffe Squires
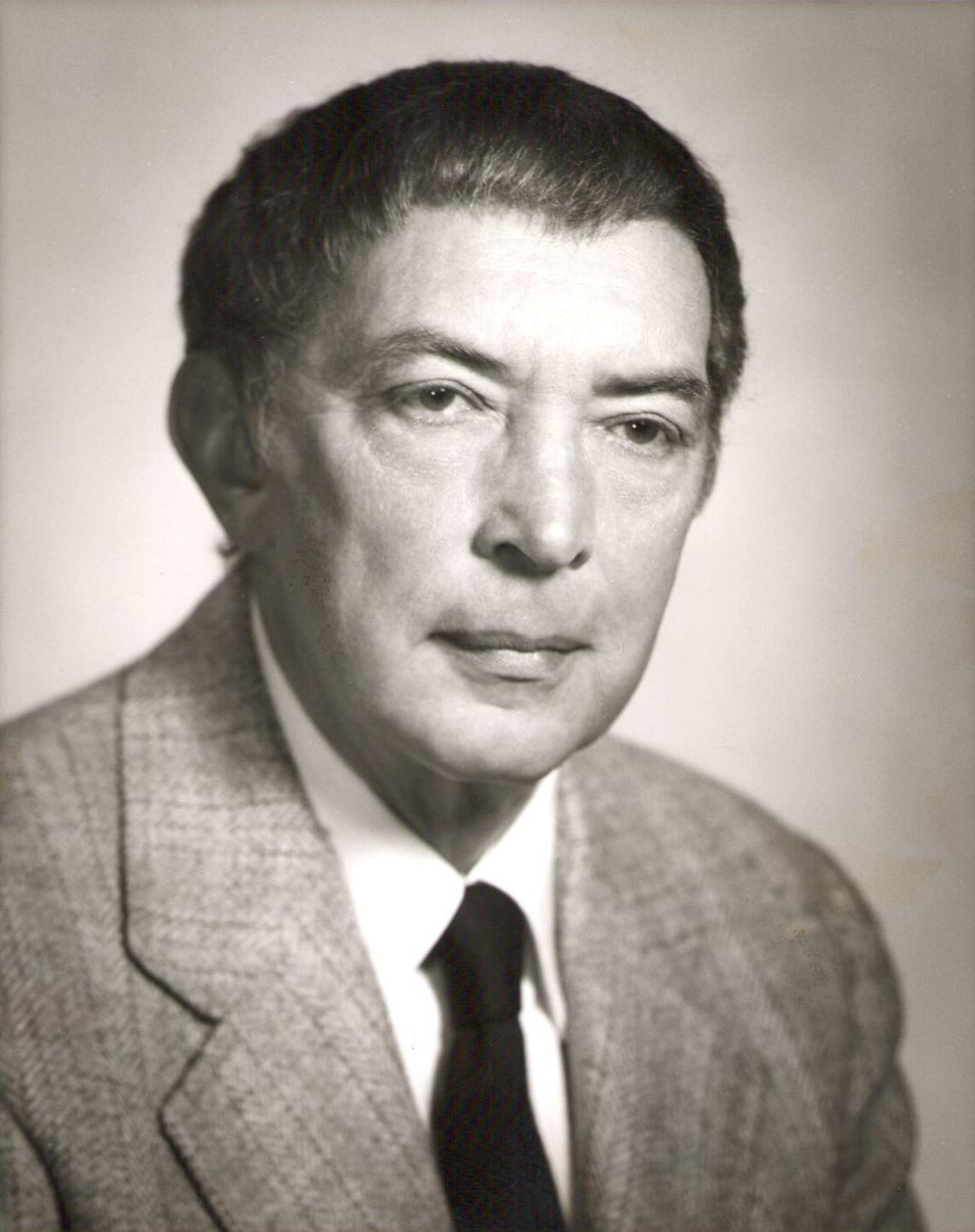
- Portrait of Radcliffe Squires, 1975 (Courtesy of Dana Gioia)
- Born: May 5, 1917; Salt Lake City, Utah, U.S.
- Died: February 14, 1993 (aged 75)
- Known for: Mid 20th Century Poet

Radcliffe Squires (May 5, 1917 – February 14, 1993) was an American poet, writer, critic, and academic. He published several well-regarded books of poetry, as well as biographical and critical works which focused on highly acclaimed 20th-century writers.

== Biography ==
Radcliffe Squires was born on May 5, 1917, in Salt Lake City, Utah. The son of a barber, he earned his bachelor's degree from the University of Utah in 1940. He served in the Navy during World War II, and completed his graduate studies after the war at the University of Chicago, where he received his master's degree and co-founded the literary magazine Chicago Review in 1946. He was awarded a Ph.D. from Harvard University in 1952. After teaching at Dartmouth College, Squires joined the University of Michigan as an instructor of English language and literature in 1952, where he began a long teaching career. Following his retirement in 1982, Squires continued to teach seminars for first-year students and remained active as an essayist and reviewer. His work appeared in various magazines, such as The New Republic, The Hudson Review, Poetry, The Paris Review, and The Sewanee Review. Squires was also the author of seven books of poetry, one novel, and numerous critical books and essays. He accepted an invitation to read a number of his poems for audio recording and historical preservation at the Library of Congress on April 18, 1977, as part of the Archive of Recorded Poetry and Literature, sponsored by the Gertrude Clarke Whittall Poetry and Literature Fund. He served as the editor of the Michigan Quarterly Review.

Radcliffe Squires died in 1993 of an abdominal aneurysm at Ann Arbor University Hospital in Michigan at the age of 75. He outlived his wife, the former Eileen Mulholland, who died in 1976.

== Critical response ==
Although well esteemed in his lifetime, Squires never enjoyed literary celebrity. His poetry was widely reviewed, but his poems were rarely anthologized. He did not win any major awards, but his work, especially his later volumes of verse, attracted powerful advocates, including Dana Gioia, Anne Stevenson, David Mason, and Emily Grosholz.

Poet and critic Dana Gioia wrote: “Squires deserves consideration as one of the finest American poets writing today.”

In a review of his early poems, the poet Anne Stevenson wrote that "all Squires' poems share common properties—wit, thought, and a philosophy of nature in which Man is a sacred, yet ruinous intrusion."

“Squires' poetry focused on the western United States, especially the area around Utah where he was born and raised, and on the world of classical Greece," said University of Michigan English Professor Laurence Goldstein. "His short lyrics favor mountain landscape and metaphysical speculation, and his long narrative poems concern the legendary figures of Beowulf, Hercules and Daedalus. His critical books, The Loyalties of Robinson Jeffers and The Major Themes of Robert Frost, were important early evaluations of the two poets, and his critical study, Allen Tate: A Literary Biography, remains the standard survey of Tate's writings."

In the Oxford Companion to 20th Century Poetry, Poet David Mason wrote that "The mannered formality of his early verse has given way to poems that are powerfully evocative of travel as travail, a struggle for knowledge and insight in a world often mysteriously cruel...Squires has written about America, Greece, and Spain, and many of his best poems are unassumingly personal, such as the powerful sequence from Journeys (1983) in which, after the death of his wife in 1976, he faces the shattering prospect of a life without love."

When Squires's Where the Compass Spins appeared in 1951, John Holmes commented in The New York Times that in writing about "his family, a football game, the movies, a subway ride...[Mr. Squires] lifts these things to unforgettable importance" Richard Eberhart, writing in The Kenyon Review, mentioned the poetry's "elegant sophistication... the moods of delicate and bitter poignancy, the sense of long regarded places, subtle relationships." Mr. Eberhart concluded: "He writes (one would almost say 'Keatsian' sometimes of him) with insight... and can rise... to tones reminiscent of Hart Crane." "

=== Gardens of the World ===
Gardens of the World (1981) is generally considered to be Squires finest volume. Reviewing it in The Hudson Review, Dana Gioia wrote : "Nothing in Radcliffe Squires's first five books of poetry will have prepared readers for Gardens of the World. Somehow at the age of sixty-three, long after the point when most writers settle into comfortable repetition, this little-known poet has focused all of his talent into one stunning and original collection."

Poet and philosopher Emily Grosholz commented in the New England Review on the collection's poetic meditations on the landscape of the American West: “he brings us to the level, not of sentient creatures, but of rocks, dust and barren earth, finding in what is dead something fr more important than life, which is moreover the hidden spring of life. Thus he confounds our thoughtlessly held distinctions between life and death, spirit and matter.” Writing on the volume's last nine poems, Grosholz concludes they “are extraordinarily sophisticated variations on the theme of gardens, which are...figurae for the imagination.”

John Ciardi wrote in The Western Humanities Review: "I venture the guess that many of these poems must endure as long as English poems are read... I think,,, that when the time has had a chance to sift the chaff from the cliques Radcliffe Squires will come to be recognized asa one of the most valid singers of life now at work among us."

== Literary criticism ==
Squires produced a critical study of Robert Frost, a biography of Frederic Prokosch, and a pioneering volume about Robinson Jeffers. All earlier books on Jeffers had been written by people associated with the poet. Squires also authored one of the earliest in-depth studies of Allen Tate, Allen Tate: A Literary Biography (1971), and edited an important collection of essays, Allen Tate and His Work.

Allen Tate and His Work was first published in 1972. Squires compared the aim of Tate's diverse achievements as essayist, novelist, and poet, to a simple physics experiment in which students are taught the principles of pressure. Squires wrote: "The synergy of Allen Tate's poetry, fiction, and essays has had the aim of applying pressure—think of the embossed, bitterly stressed lines, his textured metaphors—until it brings up before our eyes a blanched parody of the human figure, which is our evil, the world's evil, so that we begin to long for God. That has seemed to him a worthwhile task to perform for modern man threatened by such fatal narcissism, such autotelic pride that he is in danger of disappearing into a glassy fantasy of his own concoction. We shall need his help for a long time to come.”

== Books ==
=== Poetry ===
- Cornar, 1940.
- Where the Compass Spins, 1951.
- Fingers of Hermes, 1965.
- The Light Under Islands 1967.
- Daedalus, 1968.
- Waiting in the Bone, 1973. (Illustrated by Keith Achepohl)
- Gardens of the World, 1981.
- Journeys, 1983.
- Selected Poems 1950-1985, 2017. (Selected with an introduction by Donald Beagle and an afterword by Theodore Haddin)

=== Criticism ===
- The Loyalties of Robinson Jeffers, 1961.
- Frederic Prokosch (Twayne's United States Authors Series), 1964.
- Allen Tate: A Literary Biography, 1971.
- Allen Tate and His Work: Critical Evaluations, 1972.
- The Major Themes of Robert Frost, 1981.
