= Food conspiracy =

Food Conspiracy is a term applied to a movement begun in the San Francisco Bay Area in 1968 in which households pooled their resources to buy food in bulk from farmers and small wholesalers and distribute it cheaply. The name came to describe a loose network of autonomous collectives which shared common values and, in many cases, suppliers. Many participants were seeking an alternative to supermarkets and became involved to obtain direct control of the quality and type of food they were sourcing, with a strong focus on wholefoods and organic produce.

The adoption of the name 'food conspiracy' has been described by a participant as a "response to the Nixon-Agnew rhetoric of the time (which) had us all as communist conspirators against the state, the war and public morality."

Many leaflets circulated encouraging participation and a short how-to guide was published, 'The Great Food Buying Conspiracy', which offered a route map to sourcing fresh fruit and vegetables, cheese and organic dry goods. For fresh produce, monies would be pooled at a weekly order meeting and volunteers would then make an early morning visit to the wholesale vegetable market in Oakland or San Francisco to buy boxes and crates of organically grown fruits and vegetables. These would be returned to a central location, often a members' home, and made ready for collection later in the morning. In this way, members could achieve savings of up to 50%.

A key feature of each Food Conspiracy group was staying small, a situation maintained by groups splitting when reaching a certain size rather than keep on growing. Thus, the initial Berkeley conspiracy, established in 1969, had become eight distinct groups within less than a year and, by 1974, there were 60 conspiracies in the city with around 2,000 members. The scale of the groups tended to help ensure a high level of direct involvement in the practical roles required for its operation. Indeed, The Food Conspiracy Cookbook (1974) argues that "Conspiracies only work if all who benefit take an active part in its working and decisions."

In addition to investigating potential suppliers, key operating tasks would include compiling a listing of available goods, collating member orders, receiving and recording payments, picking up produce from growers, hosting deliveries from wholesalers, checking-in deliveries and weighing and assembling individual orders ready for collection by members. A group would collectively decide whether or not to apply a modest fee or add-on to build a small surplus to use for shared benefit.

Over time, some food conspiracies went on to formalise as food cooperatives, bulk and natural foods distributors or developed as larger buying groups with a paid organiser. However, the conspiracy model - then and now - seeks to provide food to members by accomplishing all needed tasks collectively, without paid staff or a store front presence.

The trading name "Food Conspiracy" is used by a long-established wholefood co-op in Tucson, Arizona which originated in 1971 with local political activists who formed a buying club to address difficulties in finding natural and organic food. The following year, it opened a storefront and since 1974 has operated from its present home at 412 N. Fourth Avenue. Originally run as a workers' collective, it later developed toward a consumer cooperative model. Today it provides a full-service food market, open to the public and with more than 3,000 member-owners.
