= Tamar (poem) =

Epic poem by Robinson Jeffers

Tamar is an epic poem by the American writer Robinson Jeffers, first published in 1924. A tale of incest and violence, it follows Tamar Cauldwell, the daughter of a Californian ranch family, as she experiences transgression, hatred, and destruction. Tamar was the first unrhymed narrative poem Jeffers wrote. The story makes references to the biblical Books of Samuel and deals with themes of nature and corruption.

== Background ==
Robinson Jeffers had written rhymed narrative poems in the 1910s without any significant success. He switched to writing unrhymed poetry in 1920; after writing a number of lyrical poems, where a gradual change in his approach to nature can be observed, he returned to epic verse with Tamar. He may have been ambivalent about the narrative form, as the earliest note related to Tamar includes the comment "My last story!" From Jeffers' notes, it appears as if he began to write Tamar in March or April 1922, and he was definitely working on it in June 1922, when he wrote about being in the process of developing measures for unrhymed, flexible, narrative poetry in English. Tamar was at the latest finished in the summer of 1923 and might have been finished in January or February.

The story is inspired by the Books of Samuel in the Old Testament, especially 2 Samuel 13, which tells the story of Amnon's rape of his sister Tamar. Jeffers transposed elements of this biblical story to a Californian setting. Among Jeffers' notes from the writing of Tamar is a table that shows how characters in the poem are meant to correspond to biblical figures: David is King David, Lee is Amnon, Will is Absalom and Tamar is Tamar.

== Plot ==
Lee Cauldwell, the son of a ranch family at Point Lobos in California, decides to stop drinking one night when he returns drunk from Monterey, falls into the sea and is saved by his sister Tamar. Also living at the ranch are their father David, their deceased mother's mediumistic sister Stella, and their father's mentally disabled sister Jinny. Some time later, Lee and Tamar visit a secluded water pool, and after Tamar sees her own reflection in the water, she manipulates Lee to have sexual intercourse with her. They continue their relationship, but by coincidence, Tamar learns that her father had a sexual relationship with his now deceased sister Helen; Tamar is disappointed that her own transgression appears to be a mere repetition, and develops a desire to destroy her family. She learns she is pregnant with Lee's child, and to disguise the incest she begins a sexual relationship with another young man, Will Andrews.

As Tamar's frustration grows, she consults Stella in an attempt to contact Helen's ghost, but the procedure does not go as planned. As they settle by the sea and Stella goes into a trance, a series of other ghosts speak through her, make Tamar dance naked against her will, and a large number of invisible ghosts appear to rape her, before she is able to speak with Helen. Tamar has made an attempt to burn down the ranch house, leaving a piece of paper at the bottom of a lit candle, but Helen tells her the attempt will fail, and that Tamar has no control over fire, God, or the dead.

Tamar is sick and bedridden. She is convinced that the family needs to become purely sinful to achieve freedom and peace, and manipulates her father into having sex with her. She is able to gather Lee, Will, and David in the house at the same time; Lee will leave for the army the next day to fight in France, and Will proposes to Tamar. Helen, speaking through Stella, warns that the men who go to Tamar's room will be consumed by fire, but the news about Will's proposal makes the three men join Tamar in her room, and Stella/Helen follows them. On the floor below, Jinny irrationally sets fire to herself and the house, killing everybody inside.

== Themes and interpretations ==
In Tamar, Jeffers treats all aspects of his characters and the way they act as part of nature. As in his early unrhymed lyrical poems, humans are presented as expressions of natural forces, but unlike in the lyrical poems, Tamar's action-oriented story places the characters in situations where they confront or attempt to avoid what this implies for human action and consciousness. The English studies scholars William Nolte and Terence Diggory have interpreted Tamar's dance scene as the moment where it becomes clear that Tamar cannot, as she thought, live outside of nature. After writing Tamar, a major theme in Jeffers' lyrical poetry became the struggle of humans to find a place and a form of mediation in a world defined by nature's drama.

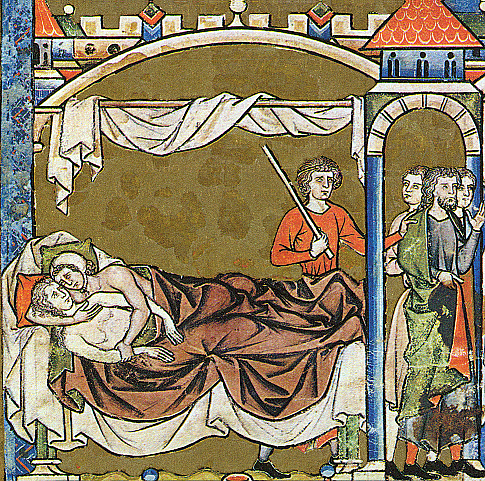
Amnon and Tamar pictured in the 13th-century Maciejowski Bible

The Book of Samuel, to which Tamar makes references, contains a theme of corruption, which Jeffers' applied to his view of contemporary Western civilization. Central to his critique was the destruction during World War I; Jeffers thought a civilization where that scale of death and mobilization was possible must be weak. The theme of war is brought up in the poem when Lee desires to leave the destruction at his home and enlist in the army, establishing a connection between private and public violence.

According to Horace Gregory, Tamar is in parts reminiscent of "a Calvinist sermon" and shows influences from Friedrich Nietzsche and Sophocles. The Tamar character has a theme of longing to never have been born. At one point, Tamar expresses a line of thought from Marquis de Sade's Justine, about the necessity to purge the goodness in oneself, and her relationship with her brother ends with a scene where he whips her. According to Gregory, the annihilation by fire at the end of the story recalls both the Christian conception of Hell and Roman funeral pyres.

== Publication history ==
Tamar first appeared in Jeffers' poetry collection Tamar and Other Poems, self-published on April 30, 1924, through the printer Peter Boyle. The year after it appeared in the collection Roan Stallion, Tamar and Other Poems, which was published by Boni & Liveright and republished in 1935 by Random House Modern Library. The poem is included in Random House's The Selected Poetry of Robinson Jeffers from 1938 and volume one of Stanford University Press' The Collected Poetry of Robinson Jeffers from 1988.

== Reception ==
Gregory wrote in 1961 that "Tamar, beneath the surface of a swiftly moving plot, has a richness of detail that rivals the complex fabric of Elizabethan dramatic verse" and placed it "among the major accomplishments in twentieth-century poetry".

== See also ==
- Incest in the Bible
