= Robinson Jeffers =

American poet (1887–1962)

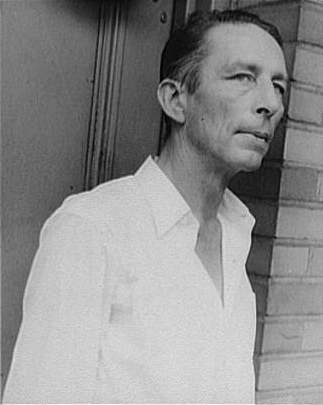
- Jeffers in 1937
- Born: John Robinson Jeffers; January 10, 1887; Allegheny, Pennsylvania, U.S.
- Died: January 20, 1962 (aged 75); Carmel-by-the-Sea, California, U.S.
- Education: Occidental College
- Occupations: Poet and environmentalist
- Relatives: Hamilton Jeffers (brother)

John Robinson Jeffers (January 10, 1887 – January 20, 1962) was an American poet known for his work about the central Californian coast. Much of his poetry was written in narrative and epic form; however, he is also known for his shorter verse and is considered a pioneer of ecopoetry and an icon of the environmental movement.

Influential and highly regarded in some circles, despite or because of his philosophy of "inhumanism", Jeffers believed that transcending conflict required human concerns to be de-emphasized in favor of the boundless whole. This led him to oppose American participation in World War II, a stance that was controversial after the U.S. entered the war.

== Life ==
John Robinson Jeffers was born on January 10, 1887, in Allegheny, Pennsylvania (now part of Pittsburgh), the son of Reverend Dr. William Hamilton Jeffers, a Presbyterian minister and scholar of ancient languages and Biblical history, and Annie Robinson Tuttle. His brother was Hamilton Jeffers, a well-known astronomer who worked at Lick Observatory. Jeffers traveled through Europe during his youth and attended school in Germany, France, and Switzerland. An outstanding student, he was instructed in the classics and Greek and Latin language and literature. By age twelve, he was fluent in German and French as well as English. He earned his bachelor's degree from Occidental College in Los Angeles at age 18. While attending college, he was an avid outdoorsman and active in the school's literary societies.

After he graduated from Occidental, Jeffers went to the University of Southern California (USC) to study at first literature, and then medicine. He met Una Call Kuster in 1906; she was three years older than he, a graduate student, and the wife of a Los Angeles attorney, Edward G. Kuster. Jeffers and Una Kuster became lovers; Ted Kuster discovered their affair in 1910. Jeffers dropped out of USC medical school and enrolled as a forestry student at the University of Washington in Seattle, a course of study that he abandoned after a semester, at which time he returned to Los Angeles. By 1912 the affair became a scandal, reaching the front page of the Los Angeles Times. Una spent seven months in Europe to quiet things down, then the lovers lived together by Lake Washington to await the completion of Una's divorce. The two were married in 1913, then moved to La Jolla, California, for six weeks, and finally Carmel-by-the-Sea, California, in 1914, where Jeffers later constructed Tor House and Hawk Tower. The couple had a daughter who died a day after birth in 1913, and then twin sons, Donnan and Garth, in 1916. Una died of cancer in 1950. Jeffers died on January 20, 1962; an obituary can be found in The New York Times from January 22, 1962.

=== Tor House ===
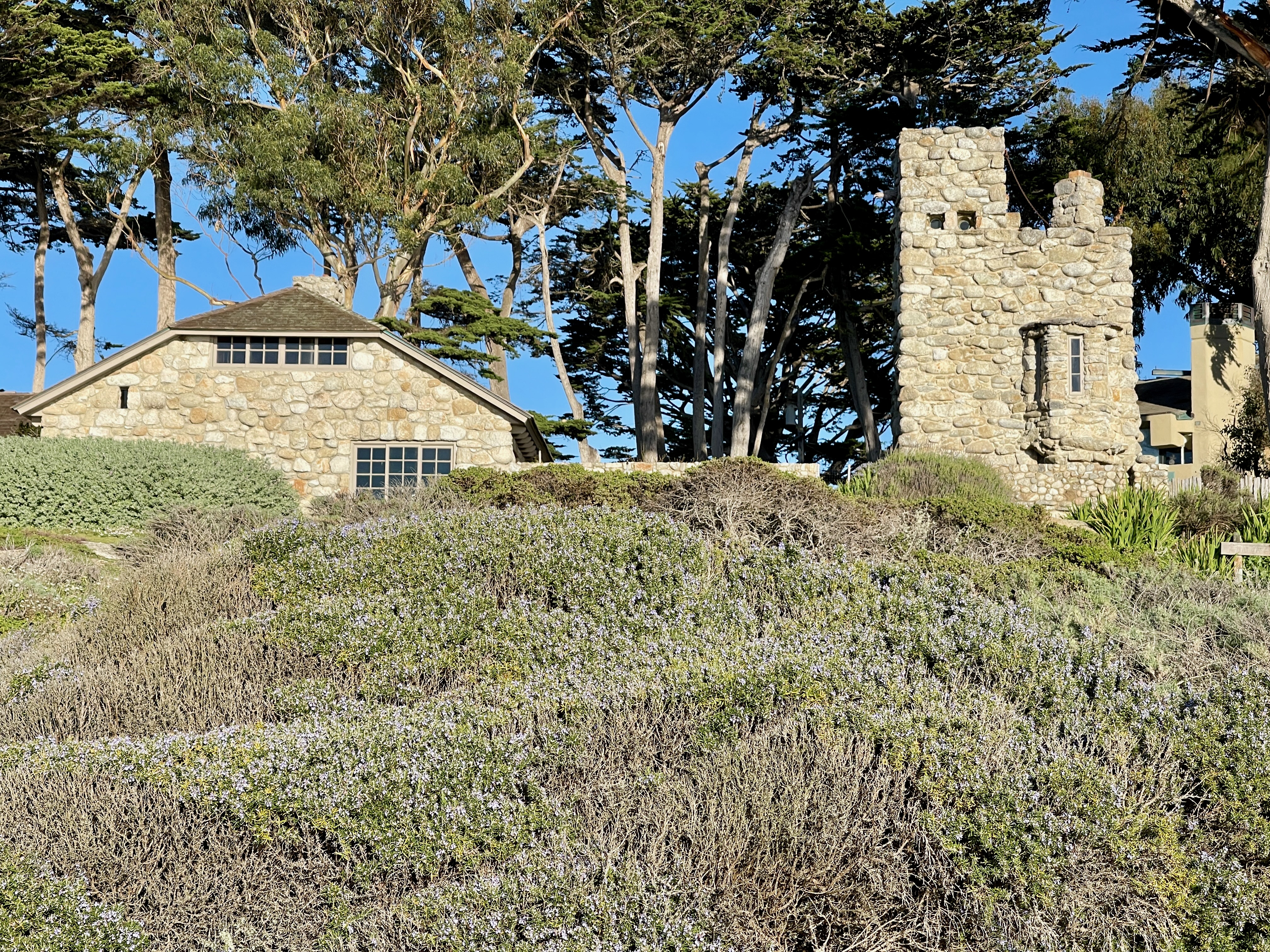
Tor House and Hawk Tower, viewed from Pacific Ocean side

In the 1920s and 1930s, at the height of his popularity, Jeffers was famous for being a tough outdoorsman, living in relative solitude and writing of the difficulty and beauty of the wild. He spent most of his life in Carmel, California, in a granite house that he built with his own hands which they named "Tor House". Tor is a term for a craggy outcrop or lookout. Before Jeffers and Una purchased the land where Tor House would be built, they rented two cottages in Carmel, and enjoyed many afternoon walks and picnics at the "tors" near the site that would become Tor House.

To build the first part of Tor House, a small, two-story cottage, Jeffers hired a local builder, Michael J. Murphy. He worked with Murphy, and in this short, informal apprenticeship, he learned the art of stonemasonry. He continued adding on to Tor House throughout his life, writing in the mornings and working on the house in the afternoons. Many of his poems reflect the influence of stone and building on his life.

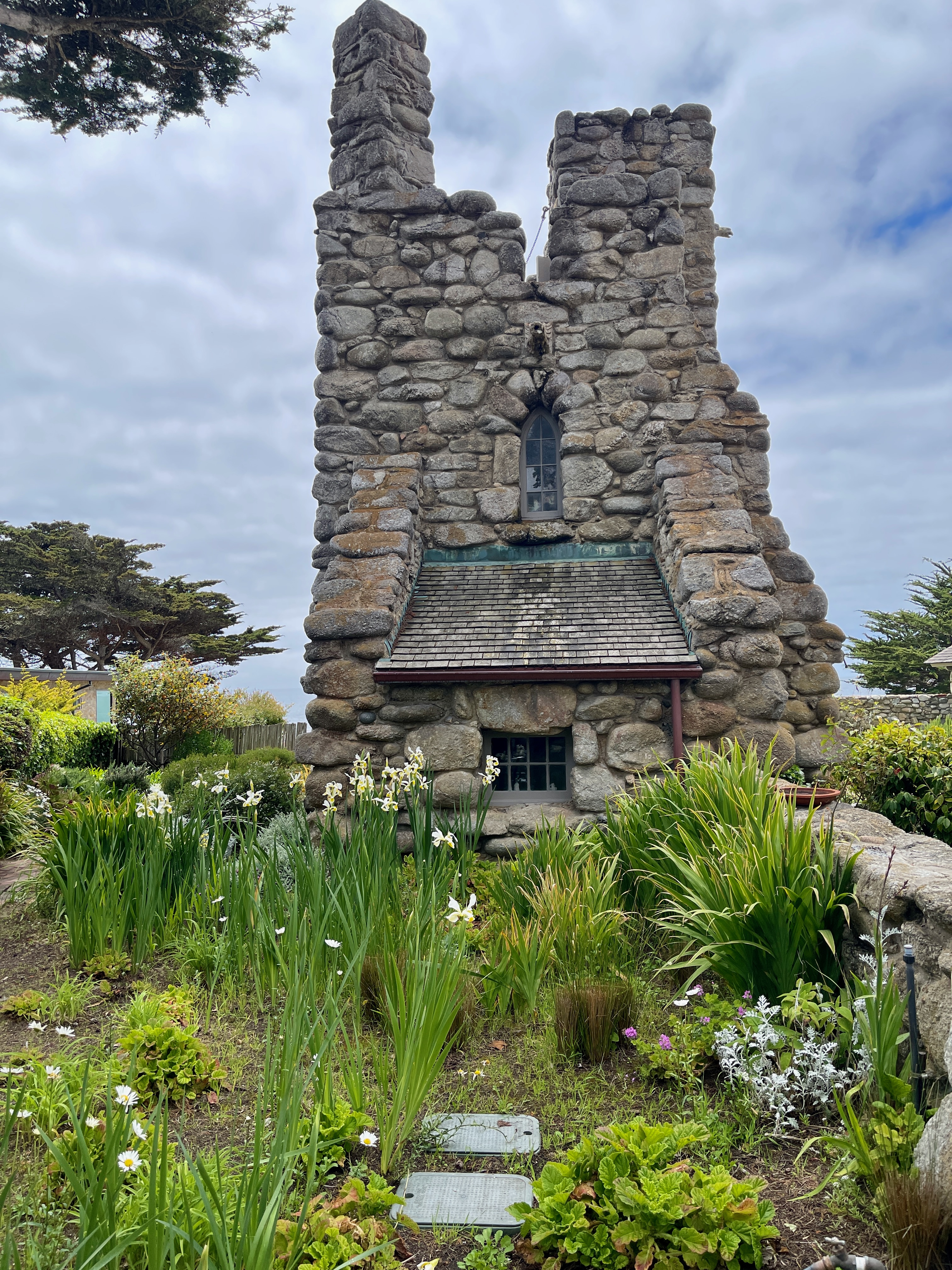
Hawk Tower

He later built a large four-story stone tower on the site called "Hawk Tower". While he had not visited Ireland at this point in his life, it is possible that Hawk Tower is based on Francis Joseph Bigger's 'Castle Séan' at Ardglass, County Down, which had also in turn influenced William Butler Yeats' choice of a poet's tower, Thoor Ballylee. Construction on Tor House continued into the late 1950s and early 1960s, and was completed by his eldest son. The completed residence was used as a family home until his descendants decided to turn it over to the Tor House Foundation, formed by Ansel Adams, for historic preservation. The romantic Gothic tower was named after a hawk that appeared while Jeffers was working on the structure, and which disappeared the day it was completed. The tower was a gift for his wife Una, who had a fascination for Irish literature and stone towers. In Una's special room on the second floor were kept many of her favorite items, photographs of Jeffers taken by the artist Edward Weston, plants and dried flowers from Shelley's grave, and a rosewood melodeon which she loved to play. The tower also included a secret interior staircase – a source of great fun for his young sons.

== Poetic career ==
In the 1920s Jeffers began to publish long narrative poems, including Tamar and Roan Stallion. Often styled after the epic form of ancient Greeks, these poems were full of controversial subjects such as incest, murder, and parricide. Jeffers' short verse includes "Hurt Hawks," "The Purse-Seine", and "Shine, Perishing Republic." His intense relationship with the physical world is described in often brutal and apocalyptic verse, which shows a preference for the natural world over what he sees as the deleterious influence of civilization. Jeffers did not accept the idea that meter is a fundamental part of poetry, and, like Marianne Moore, claimed that his verse was composed not in meter but in "rolling stresses." He believed that meter was imposed on poetry by man and was not a fundamental part of poetry's nature.

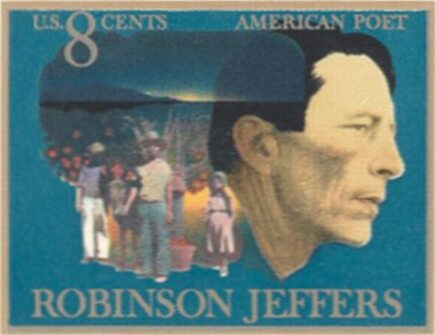
Robinson Jeffers 1973 stamp

Many books followed Jeffers's initial success with the epic form, including an adaptation of Euripides' Medea, which became a hit Broadway play starring Judith Anderson.

George Sterling and Jeffers were good friends. Their fellow-poets Edgar Lee Masters and, longer, Benjamin De Casseres, were correspondents. Jeffers encountered D. H. Lawrence in Mabel Dodge Luhan's circle at Taos; reports of how well they got along vary. In Carmel, Jeffers became the focal point for a small but devoted group of admirers. At the peak of his fame, he was one of the few poets to be featured on the cover of Time magazine. He was asked to read at the Library of Congress, and was posthumously put on a U.S. postage stamp.

Jeffers' 1948 collection, The Double Axe and Other Poems (1948), included several poems critical of American involvement in the Second World War and his publisher, Random House, suppressed some poems and included a note that Jeffers' views were not those of the publishing company. The book was negatively reviewed by several critics, including the poets Yvor Winters and Kenneth Rexroth. By 1977 Jeffers' reservations seemed prescient and Liveright published The Double-Axe & Other Poems including Eleven Suppressed Poems, with an important introduction by William Everson, Jeffers' major posthumous advocate and poetic adherent. Throughout the fifties and afterward Jeffers figured as an important voice for the worth and rights of the natural world, as the environmental movement gathered strength. His long-time friend, the photographer Ansel Adams, was a close ally in this, as was Edward Weston.

=== Inhumanism ===
Jeffers coined the word "inhumanism": the belief that humankind is too self-centered and indifferent to the "astonishing beauty of things." In the poem "Carmel Point" Jeffers called on humans to "uncenter" themselves. In "The Double Axe" Jeffers explicitly described "inhumanism" as "a shifting of emphasis and significance from man to 'notman'; the rejection of human solipsism, and recognition of the trans-human magnificence... This manner of thought and feeling is neither misanthropic nor pessimist... It offers a reasonable detachment as rule of conduct, instead of love, hate and envy... it provides magnificence for the religious instinct, and satisfies our need to admire greatness and rejoice in beauty."

In The Loyalties of Robinson Jeffers, the first in-depth study of Jeffers not written by one of his circle, the poet and critic James Radcliffe Squires addresses the question of a reconciliation of the beauty of the world and potential beauty in mankind: "Jeffers has asked us to look squarely at the universe. He has told us that materialism has its message, its relevance, and its solace. These are different from the message, relevance, and solace of humanism. Humanism teaches us best why we suffer, but materialism teaches us how to suffer."

== Influence ==
His poems have been translated into many languages and published all over the world. Outside of the United States, he is most popular in Japan and the Czech Republic. William Everson, Edward Abbey, Robert McDowell, Gary Snyder, and Mark Jarman are just a few recent authors who have been influenced by Jeffers. Charles Bukowski remarked that Jeffers was his favorite poet. The Polish poet Czesław Miłosz also took an interest in Jeffers's poetry and worked as a translator for several volumes of his poems. Jeffers also exchanged some letters with his Czech translator and popularizer, the poet Kamil Bednář. The writer Paul Mooney (1904–1939), son of the American Indian authority James Mooney (1861–1921) and collaborator of the travel writer Richard Halliburton (1900–1939), "was known always to carry with him (a volume of Jeffers) as a chewer might carry a pouch of tobacco ... and, like Jeffers," writes Gerry Max in Horizon Chasers, "worshipped nature ... (taking) refuge (from the encroachments of civilization) in a sort of chthonian mysticism rife with Greek dramatic elements ..."

Jeffers was influential to western U.S. photographers of the early 20th century, including Ansel Adams, Edward Weston, and Morley Baer.

Although Jeffers was largely marginalized in the mainstream academic community for decades, several important contemporary literary critics, including Albert Gelpi of Stanford University, and the poet, critic and National Endowment for the Arts chairman Dana Gioia, have consistently cited Jeffers as a formidable presence in modern literature.

Stanford University Press released a five volume compilation, The Collected Poetry of Robinson Jeffers (1988–2002). In an article titled "A Black Sheep Joins the Fold," written upon the release of the collection in 2001, Stanford Magazine commented that it was remarkable that, due to a number of circumstances, "there was never an authoritative, scholarly edition of California's premier bard" until this edition.

== Legacy ==
His poem "The Beaks of Eagles" was included in the track "California Saga" on the Beach Boys album Holland (1973).

Two lines from Jeffers's poem "We Are Those People" are quoted toward the end of the 2008 film Visioneers.

Several lines from Jeffers's poem "Wise Men in Their Bad Hours" ("Death's a fierce meadowlark: but to die having made / Something more equal to the centuries / Than muscle and bone, is mostly to shed weakness.") appear in Christopher McCandless' diary.

Robinson Jeffers is mentioned in the 2004 film I Heart Huckabees by the character Albert Markovski played by Jason Schwartzman, when defending Jeffers as a nature writer against another character's claim that environmentalism is socialism. Markovski says "Henry David Thoreau, Robinson Jeffers, the National Geographic Society...all socialists?"

A passage from Jeffers's poem "Ghost" was read in the Ghost Adventures episode "Tor House", where the Ghost Adventures crew investigated Jeffers's house to see if Jeffers's spirit would appear 50 years later after his death as was said in his poem.

In A Secular Age, a critique of Western secularization, the philosopher Charles Taylor presents Jeffers as an important literary example of "immanent anti-humanism" alongside figures such as Friedrich Nietzsche and Cormac McCarthy. Invoking (often at length) the poems "At the Birth of an Age," "Invasion," "Rock and Hawk," "Tamar," and "The Women at Point Sur," Taylor sees Jeffers as encouraging human beings to embrace the beautiful cruelty of an indifferent universe.

The poet Adrienne Rich quotes Jeffers's poem "Prelude" in her poem "Yom Kippur 1984".

Uncivilisation: The Dark Mountain Manifesto by Paul Kingsnorth and Dougald Hine opens with Jeffers' poem "Rearmament," the final line of which gives The Dark Mountain Project its name.

== Bibliography ==
- Flagons and Apples. Los Angeles: Grafton, 1912.
- Californians. New York: Macmillan, 1916.
- Tamar and Other Poems. New York: Peter G. Boyle, 1924.
- Roan Stallion, Tamar, and Other Poems. New York: Boni and Liveright, 1925.
- The Women at Point Sur. New York: Liveright, 1927.
- Cawdor and Other Poems. New York: Liveright, 1928.
- Dear Judas and Other Poems. New York: Liveright, 1929.
- Thurso's Landing and Other Poems. New York: Liveright, 1932.
- Give Your Heart to the Hawks and other Poems. New York: Random House, 1933.
- Solstice and Other Poems. New York: Random House, 1935.
- Such Counsels You Gave To Me and Other Poems. New York: Random House, 1937.
- The Selected Poetry of Robinson Jeffers. New York: Random House, 1938.
- Be Angry at the Sun. New York: Random House, 1941.
- Medea. New York: Random House, 1946.
- The Double Axe and Other Poems. New York: Random House, 1948.
- Hungerfield and Other Poems. New York: Random House, 1954.
- The Beginning and the End and Other Poems. New York: Random House, 1963.
- Robinson Jeffers: Selected Poems. New York: Vintage, 1965.
- Cawdor and Medea: A Long Poem After Euripides. New York: New Directions, 1970.
- Stones of the Sur. Stanford: Stanford University Press, 2001.

== See also ==
- "Birds and Fishes"
