= Tor House and Hawk Tower =

Historic home of poet Robinson Jeffers

- Robinson Jeffers House
- U.S. National Register of Historic Places
- U.S. National Historic Landmark
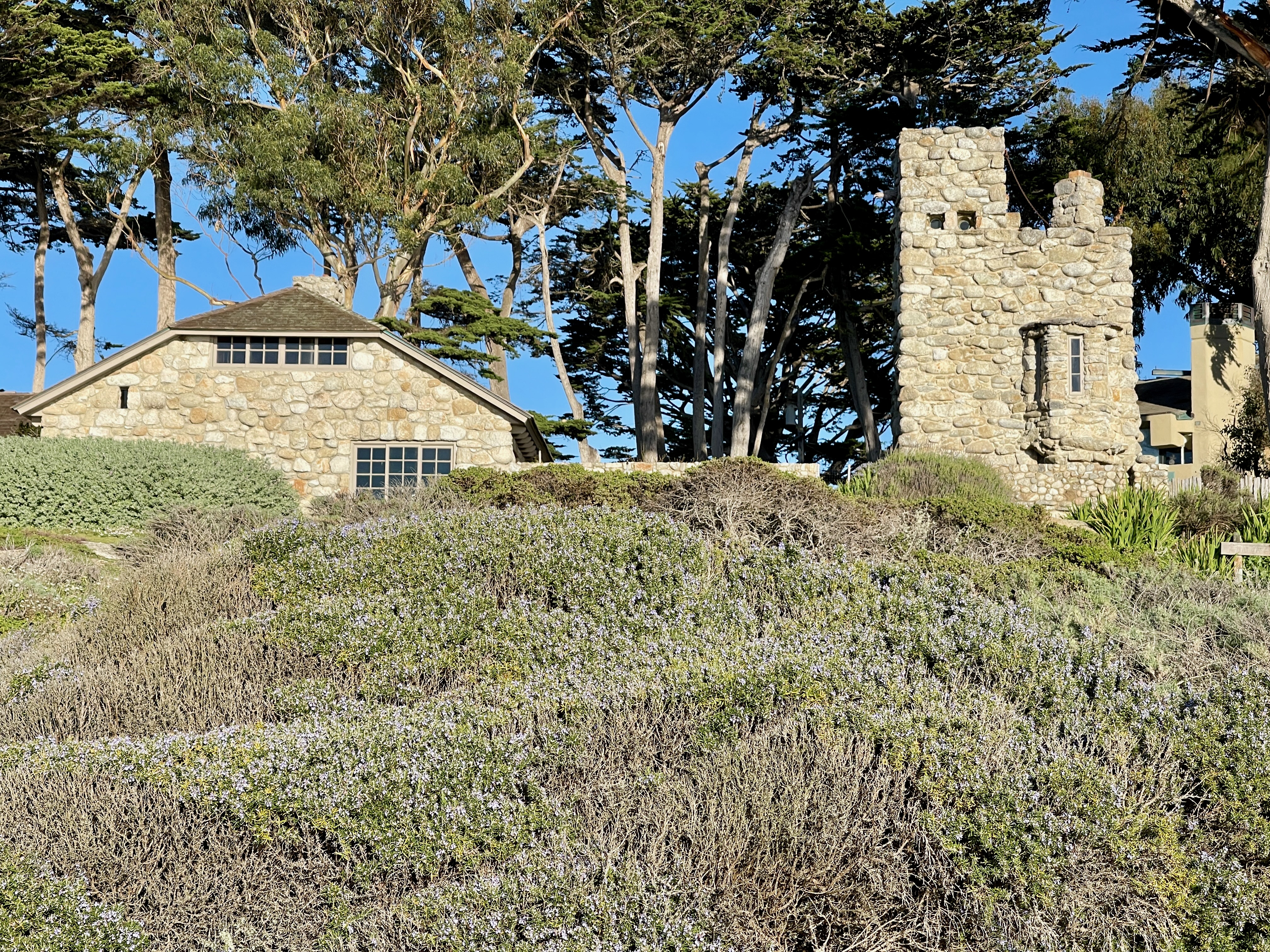
- Tor House and Hawk Tower, viewed from Pacific Ocean side

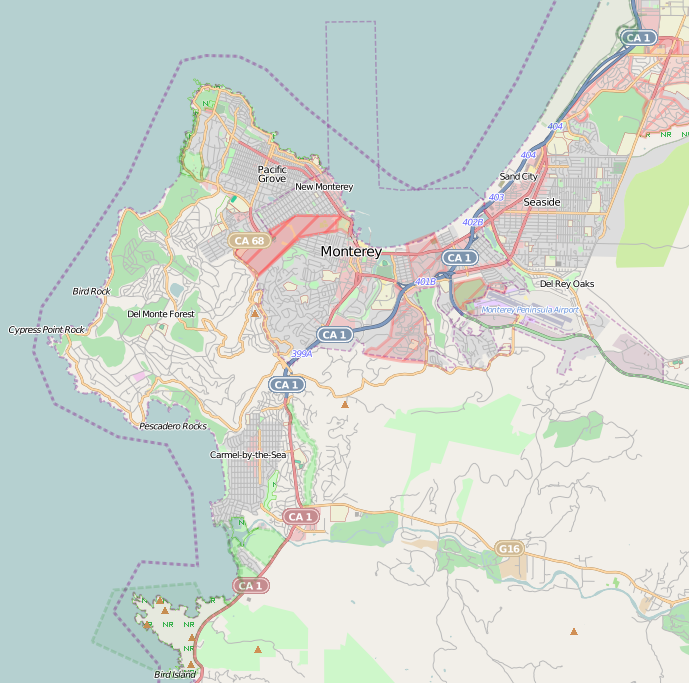
- Location within Monterey Peninsula Location within California Location within the United States
- Location: 26304 Ocean View Avenue, Carmel, California
- Coordinates: 36°32′31.5″N 121°55′56″W
- Area: 1.5 acres (0.61 ha)
- Built: 1919
- Built by: Robinson Jeffers
- NRHP reference No.: 75000444 (NRHP listing); 100011386 (NHL designation)

Significant dates
- Added to NRHP: October 10, 1975
- Designated NHL: December 13, 2024

Tor House and Hawk Tower is the historic home in Carmel Point, California, of poet Robinson Jeffers and his family from 1919 until 1999. Here Jeffers wrote all his major works of poetry.

Construction of Tor House began in 1919 and was completed in 1924, with Jeffers acting as the stonemason's apprentice. With the skills he learned in the construction of Tor House, Jeffers began work on Hawk Tower in 1920, completing it in 1924.

The Tor House Foundation was established in 1978 to oversee Tor House and Hawk Tower as a museum. In 2024 the property was designated a National Historic Landmark.

== History ==
In the fall of 1914, Robinson Jeffers and his wife, Una, gave up their plans to move to England because of the likelihood of war in Europe. A friend of Jeffers, Fred Clapp, recommended the small coastal village of Carmel to the young couple. When Jeffers moved to Carmel, his only published poetry collection was Flagons and Apples, self-published by Jeffers in 1912. Jeffers's successful career as a poet began in Carmel. He would write all his major poetry works while living at Tor House.

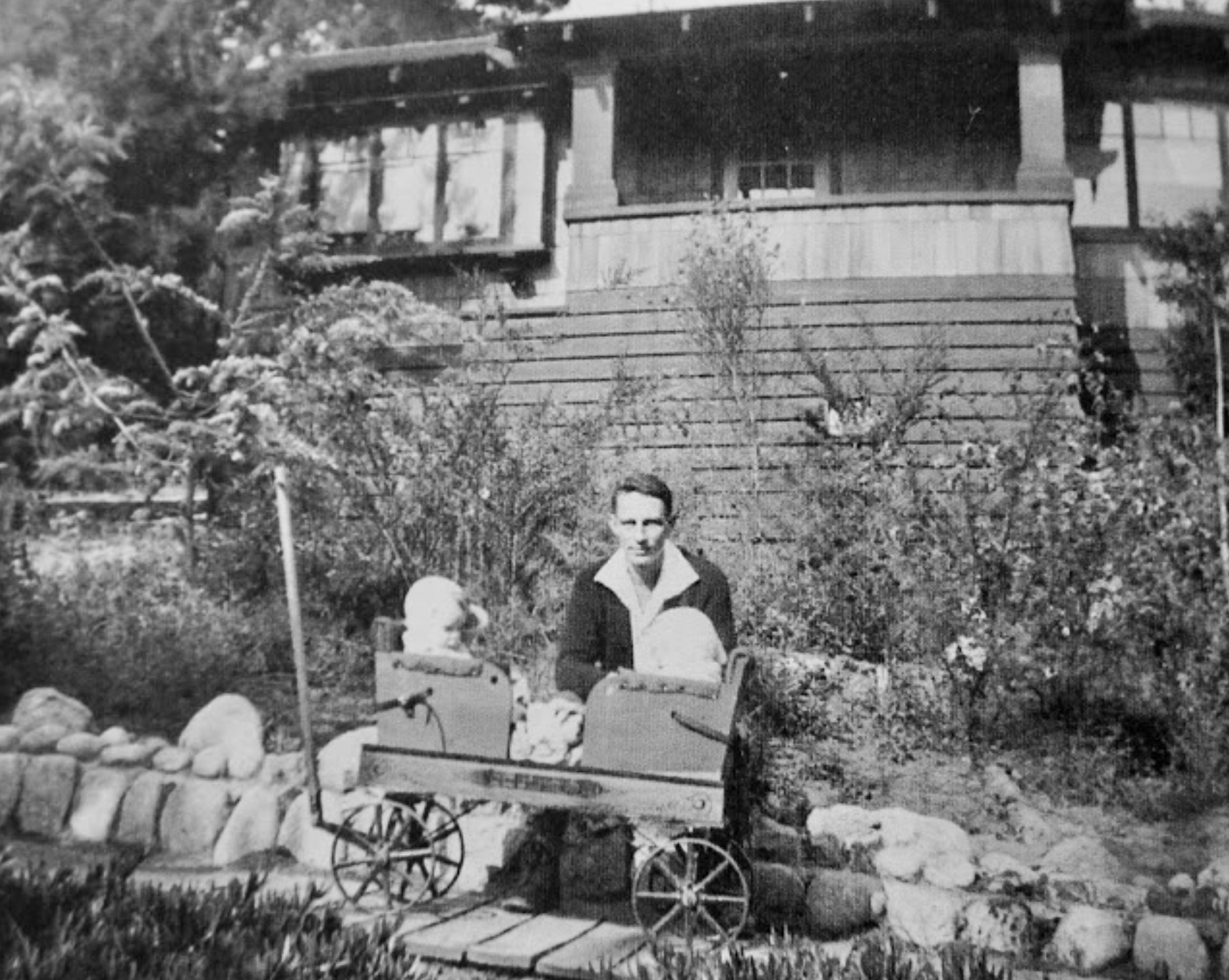
Trethaway cottage, 1917

In December, 1914, Jeffers father died and Jeffers was bequeathed a yearly annuity of $2,000, enough money to support his goal of writing poetry full time. In 1916, Una gave birth to twin boys. Needing a larger home, Jeffers moved Una and the babies to the Trethaway cottage, a wood-frame house near their home. In the spring of 1919, the couple bought property at Carmel Point, their favorite place to sit and view the ocean during their daily beach walks. They began planning for their new family home. Una wrote about the site in an article in The Carmel Pine Cone in January, 1941, "In 1919 we built Tor House on a knoll where stones jutting out of the treeless moor reminded us of tors on Dartmoor." The family would live in the small house built of stone until 1999.

== Tor House ==
=== Construction ===
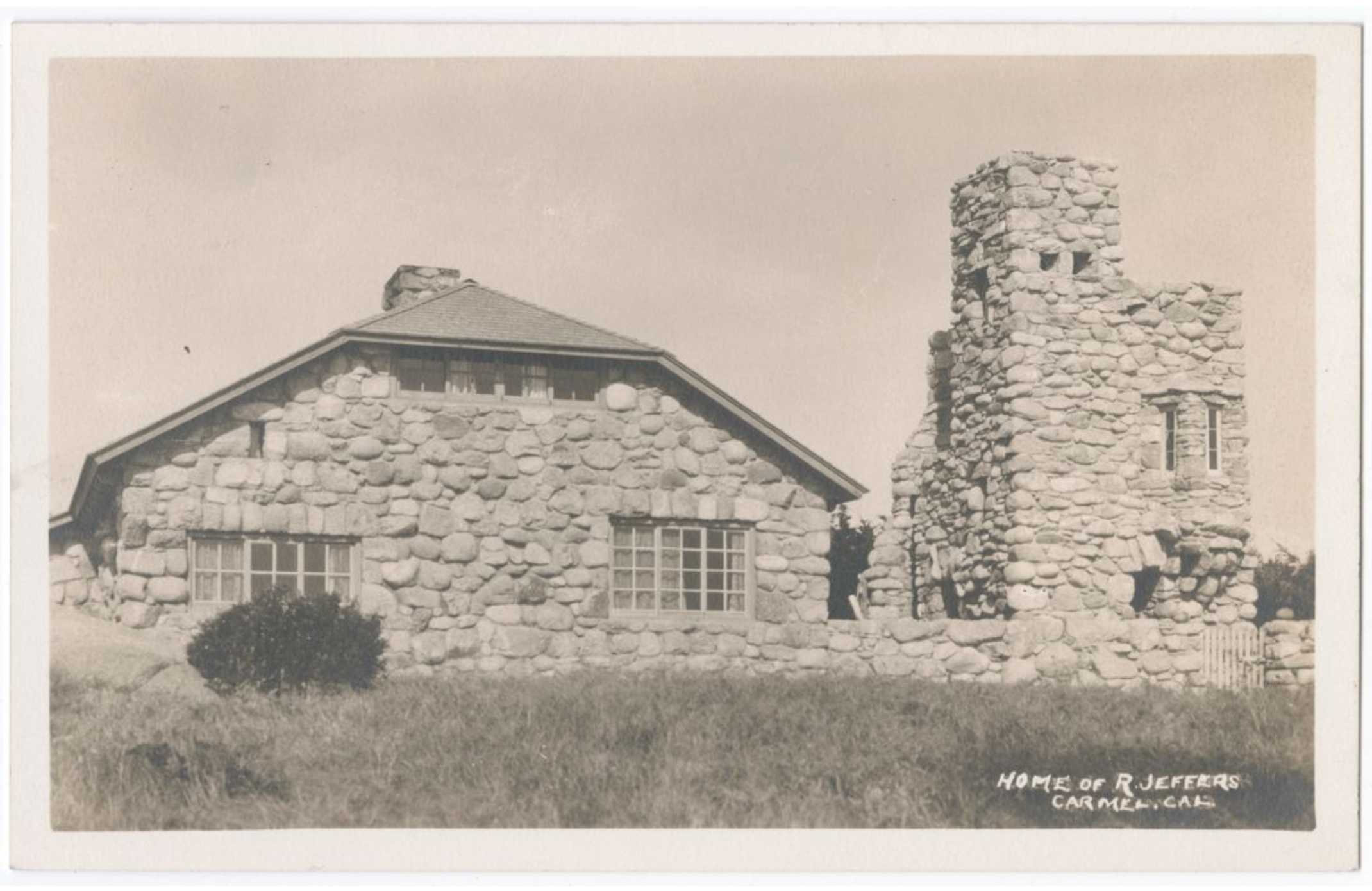
Tor House and Hawk Tower postcard

In May 1919, Jeffers contracted Mike Murphy, an established Carmel developer, to build the couple a stone cottage on their new home site. The design for the house was inspired by an old Tudor barn that Una had seen during a trip to England. Murphy's stonemason began work on the house immediately and, with Jeffers signing on later as an apprentice, was able to complete the project by mid-August. Utilizing heavy ropes and horses, granite boulders were hauled from the beach below to construct the facade of Tor House. The new home included a living room, a small guest bedroom, a kitchen, a bathroom, and sleeping places for the family in the loft. The house had running water, but no electricity until 1949. Jefferson planted 2000 trees on the property.

Soon after the cottage was complete, Jeffers himself would begin building a detached garage and a low, enclosing wall for a courtyard. He completed these in 1920, and then began to work on a stone tower. After ceasing his stonework for a year or two, he then began work on a dining room with a fireplace used for cooking that would be completed in 1930. In 1937, Jeffers began work on an annex for his sons, who were both in their 20s by then. He was unable to finish this last project due to declining health. Donnan completed the building in 1958 and moved his family into their new residence.

== Hawk Tower ==
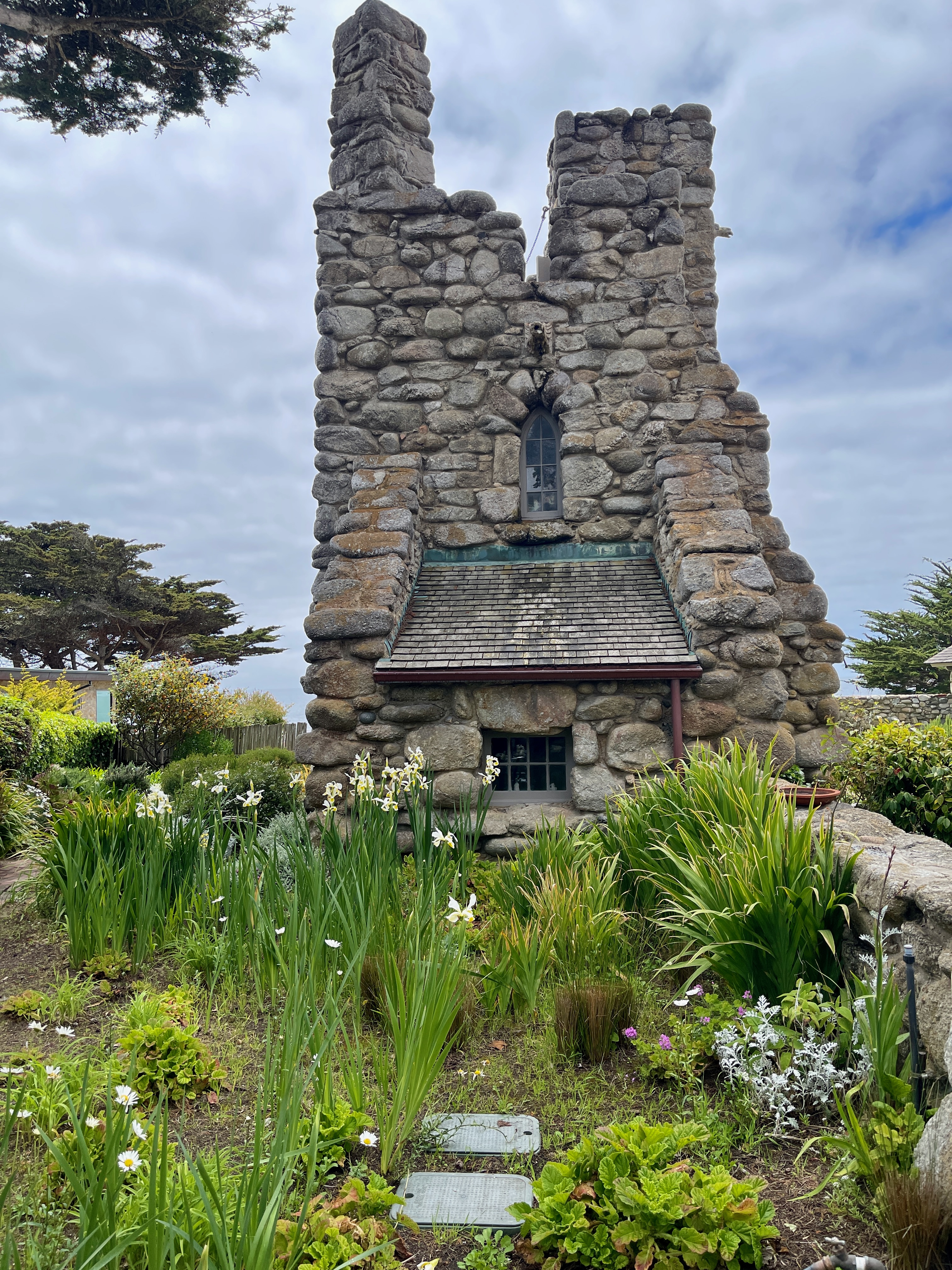
Hawk Tower

After completing a stone garage and wall on his own, Jeffers started work on a tower in 1920 that would take him four years to complete in late 1924. The inspiration for Hawk Tower was Una's fascination with the ruined round towers of Ireland. Una asked Jeffers to include a room for her and a "dungeon" for their boys with a connecting passage between the two rooms. She also wanted an elevated place to look out over the ocean. Jeffers named the tower Hawk Tower, purportedly after a hawk that appeared often while he was building the tower, but stopped appearing after he finished construction. He appeared to adopt the hawk as his symbol at the time, placing Una's symbol (a unicorn) above her second-floor door and a hawk above the door to his third-floor lookout.

Jeffers built the house with large boulders he dragged from the beach, some weighing 400 pounds. He would mix the mortar and place the stones himself. The finished tower was 40 feet high. It consisted of a "dungeon", a main room on the ground floor which was used as a dedicated writing space, a third-floor open battlement and fourth floor open turret. A spiral staircase lead to an observation point, where panoramic views of Carmel Bay, Point Lobos, and Pebble Beach can be observed. Along with boulders from the beach, Jeffers used stones in the tower that he and Una had collected from their travels as well as stones donated for the tower from their friends.

It was while building Hawk Tower between 1920 and 1924 that Jeffers is thought to have discovered his voice as a poet. He compiled and printed a limited run of the book Tamar and Other Poems during the final year of tower stonework. He was not able to find a major publisher for the book until several editors from the Book Club of California discovered him.

== Tor House Foundation ==
When the Jeffers' first arrived, Carmel was a tiny village with one unpaved street. It would later become an important center for art and culture. The Tor House Foundation was established in 1978 to oversee the Tor House and Hawk Tower as a museum, aiming to preserve its architectural integrity and historical significance. The historic site was designated a National Historic Landmark in 2024.
