= William Packard (author) =

American dramatist

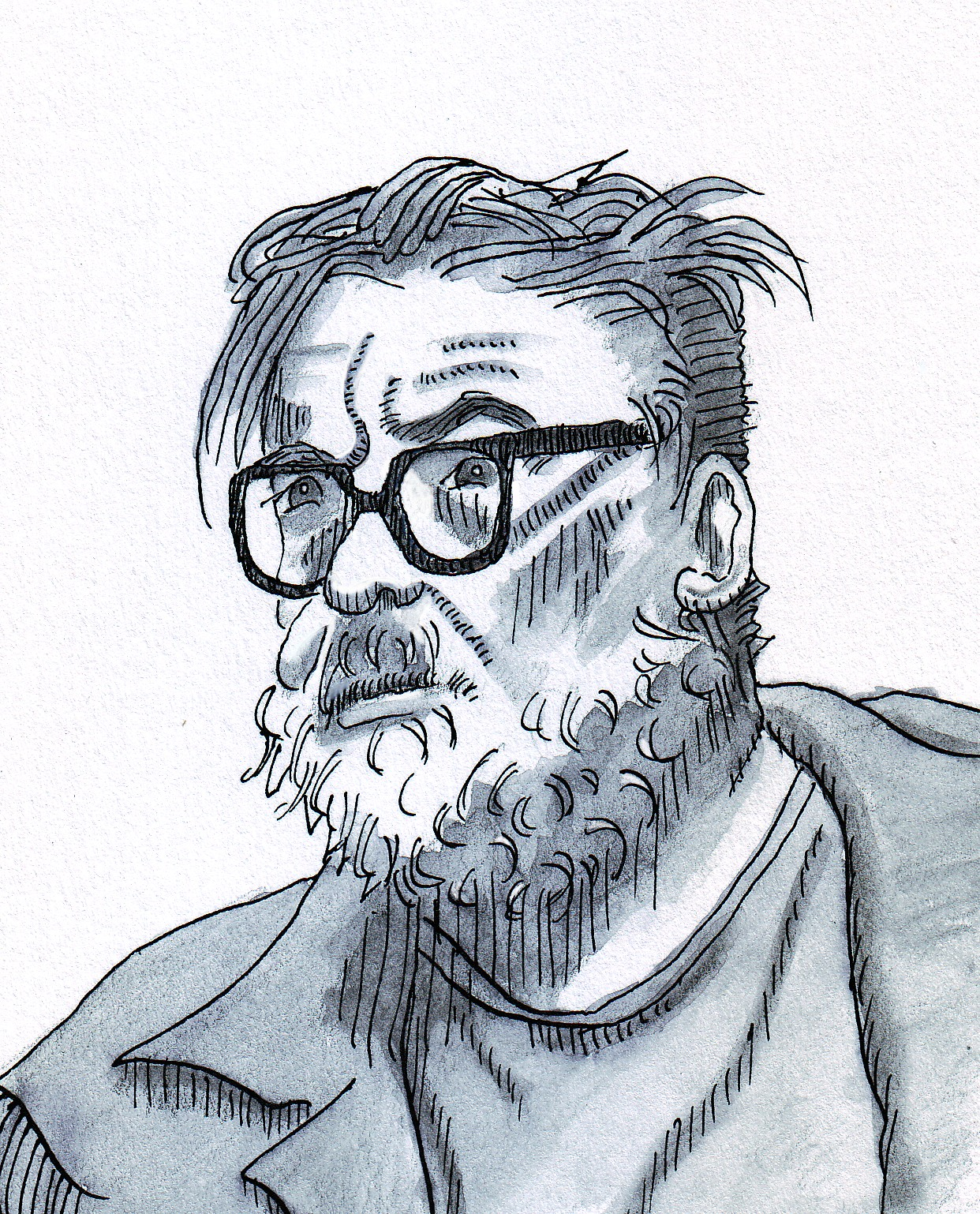
- Born: September 2, 1933; New York City, U.S.
- Died: November 3, 2002 (aged 69); Manhattan, New York City
- Occupations: Poet, playwright, editor, novelist

William Packard (September 2, 1933 – November 3, 2002) was an American poet, playwright, teacher, novelist, and he was the founder and editor of the New York Quarterly, a national poetry magazine.

== Biography ==
Packard was born September 2, 1933, and was raised in New York. He was a graduate of Stanford University, where he earned a degree in philosophy and studied under the poet and critic Yvor Winters. Packard was a presence in the literary circles of the San Francisco Bay Area in the 1950s and 60s — circles that included Allen Ginsberg, Kenneth Patchen, and Kenneth Rexroth. Packard was most active, however, in New York City, where he lived and wrote for more than half his life.

While in New York, Packard hosted the 92nd Street Y’s poetry reading series, was Vice President of the Poetry Society of America, was a member of the governing board of the Pirandello Society, and was co-director of the Hofstra Writers Conference for seven years. In 1957 he was awarded a Frost Fellowship and, in 1980, was honored with a reception at the White House for distinguished American poets.

== Literary works ==
Packard's literary career spanned nearly 50 years and resulted in the publication of six volumes of poetry, including To Peel an Apple, First Selected Poems, Voices/I hear/voices, and Collected Poems. His novel, Saturday Night at San Marcos, is a bawdy, irreverent send-up of the literary scene. It is written with “a sharp yet loving bite … Picture the pace of Jack Kerouac's 'On the Road' plus caricature worthy of Portnoy,” according to the New York Times. His translation of Racine’s Phedre, for which he was awarded the Outer Critic’s Circle Award, is the only English rendering to date to have maintained the original’s rhymed Alexandrine couplets. It was produced Off-Broadway with Beatrice Straight and Mildred Dunnock, and directed by Paul-Emile Deiber; a production which Stanley Kauffmann of the New York Times referred to as “the best performance in English of a classic French tragedy that I have seen.”. His plays include The Killer Thing, directed by Otto Preminger, Sandra and the Janitor, produced at the HB Playwrights Foundation, The Funeral, The Marriage, and War Play, produced and directed by Gene Frankel. Three collections of Mr. Packard's one-act plays, Psychopathology of Everyday Life, Threesome, and Behind the Eyes, were recently produced in New York. Packard was the great-grandson of Evangelist Dwight L. Moody and wrote the non-fiction book Evangelism in America: From Tents to TV.

== Teaching ==
Beginning in 1965, when he inherited from Louise Bogan the poetry writing classes at New York University's Washington Square Writing Center, Packard taught poetry and literature at NYU, Wagner, The New School, Cooper Union, The Bank Street Theatre, and Hofstra. He also taught acting and playwriting at the HB Studio in Manhattan. He is the author of The Art of the Playwright, The Art of Screenwriting, The Poet’s Dictionary, The Art of Poetry Writing, and The Poet’s Craft: Interviews from the New York Quarterly.

== Editor of the New York Quarterly ==
Packard was editor of the New York Quarterly (NYQ) for 33 years — from its founding 1969 until his death in 2002. He published 58 issues. Poet and novelist James Dickey called Packard "one of the great editors of our time". Cited by Rolling Stone as "the most important poetry magazine in America," the New York Quarterly earned a reputation for its “exceptional in-depth interviews” with the prominent poets W. H. Auden, John Ashbery, Paul Blackburn, Richard Eberhart, Stanley Kunitz, Anne Sexton, Franz Douskey, Charles Bukowski, and W.S. Merwin, among many others. The magazine is also heralded for supporting the work of lesser-known poets. The poet Galway Kinnell once said of the magazine, "The New York Quarterly serves an invaluable function — and that is finding and publishing wonderful talents — such as Franz Douskey, Antler, Pennant, Lifshin, Inez, Moriarty — who may not have the recognition that their work so richly deserves."

Packard's friend, the author Charles Bukowski, was often found in the pages of The New York Quarterly. Bukowski contributed poems, correspondence, and in 1985 he was the subject of the magazine's “craft interview”. Packard appears in the film, Bukowski, Born into This.

The New York Quarterly temporarily suspended publication when Packard suffered a stroke, but returned to print shortly before his death.

== Works ==
- New York Quarterly, founder and editor (1969 — 2002)
- To Peel an Apple (1963)
- Genius is Desire
- First Selected Poems
- Ty Cobb: Poem (1976)
- What Hands are These (1977)
- Do Not Go Gentle: Poems On Death (1981)
- Whales and Tombs
- Voices/I Hear/Voices (1972)
- Peaceable Kingdom: Poems (1975)
- Collected Poems (2001)
- Saturday Night at San Marcos (1985)
- Phèdre (translation) (1966)
- The Killer Thing (1979)
- Psychopathology of Everyday Life (1998)
- Threesome
- Behind the Eyes
- Evangelism in America: From Tents to TV (1999)
- The American Experience & Other Essays (1979)
- The Art of the Playwright (1987)
- The Art of Screenwriting (2001)
- The Poet's Dictionary: A Handbook of Prosody and Poetic Devices (1994)
- The Art of Poetry Writing (1992)
- The Poet’s Craft: Interviews from the New York Quarterly (2000)
- Dictionary of the Theater (1988)
- Desire: Erotic Poetry Through the Ages (1980)
- Four Plays: Sandra and the Janitor, The Funeral, The Marriage, & War Play (1975)
- The Light of Life
- The White Snake (translation) (1973)
- Ikkaku Sennin (translation)
- From Now On
- In the First Place
- My Name is Bobby (1975)
- On the Other Hand
- Once and For All
