= Nicole Stansbury =

American novelist

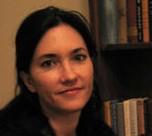
- Nicole Stansbury (2003)
- Born: May 14, 1963 (age 63); Whittier, California, U.S.
- Education: University of Utah (BA, MFA)
- Occupations: Writer, English Teacher

Nicole Stansbury (born May 14, 1963 in Whittier, California) is an American novelist, short story and essay writer.

== Biography ==
She earned a BA (1986) in English and an MFA (1991) in Creative Writing from the University of Utah.

Her novel Places to Look for a Mother (2002) and her collection of short stories The Husband's Dilemma (2004) were published by Carroll & Graf, and her shorter works have appeared in The Threepenny Review, PRISM international, and Yellow Silk.

Stansbury's works concern a range of issues including modern life in the western United States, particularly life in Utah. She has been praised for her insightful and compelling depiction of the life of non-Mormons in Mormon-dominated Utah, and more generally for her keen eye for telling detail. The setting for most of her work is domestic: her first novel concerns a mother-daughter relationship in the midst of a disintegrating family. Her stories include tales of husbands, wives and children navigating the trauma of life in contemporary America, and is sometimes humorous and at other times harrowing.

== Awards and honors ==
Stansbury has been honored numerous times for her work including several grants from the Utah Arts Council. Places to Look for a Mother won Stansbury the Barnes & Noble "Discover New Writers" award, and The Husband's Dilemma won the 2005 Utah Book Award.
