= Robert Zaller =

American author (born 1940)

Robert Michael Zaller (born 1940 in Brooklyn, New York) is an American author whose works include volumes of history, criticism, and verse. He is Drexel Distinguished University Professor of History Emeritus (Drexel University), and has been active as an opponent of the death penalty.

Robert Zaller's Blog

== Bibliography ==
AUTHOR

- 1969 - The Year One: Poems (Blue Oak Press, 1969).
- 1971 - The Parliament of 1621: A Study in Constitutional Conflict (University of California Press, 1971). ISBN 0-52001-677-7
- 1974 - Lives of the Poet: Poems (Barlenmir House, 1974).
- 1983 - The Cliffs of Solitude: A Reading of Robinson Jeffers (Cambridge University Press, 1983). ISBN 0-521-25474-4
- 1984 - Europe in Transition, 1660-1815 (Harper and Row, 1984). ISBN 0-06-047368-1
- 2006 - Islands: Poems (Somerset Hall Press, 2006). ISBN 0-9774610-2-5
- 2007 - The Discourse of Legitimacy in Early Modern England (Stanford University Press, 2007). ISBN 0-8047-5504-3
- 2012 - Robinson Jeffers and the American Sublime (Stanford University Press, 2012). ISBN 0-8047-7563-X
- 2015 - Speaking to Power: Poems. (Moonstone Press, 2015). ISBN 978-0-9898768-0-3
- 2019 - The Atom To Be Split: New and Selected Essays on Robinson Jeffers (Tor House Press). ISBN 978-0-9622774-1-2

COAUTHOR

- 1990 - Civilizations of the World: The Human Adventure (Harper and Row, 1990). ISBN 0-673-98004-9
- 1992 - Civilizations of the West: The Human Adventure (HarperCollins, 1992). ISBN 0-06-047302-9
- 2012 - The Storm Rider (Somerset Hall Press, 2012). ISBN 978-1-935244-10-3

EDITOR

- 1974 - A Casebook on Anais Nin (New American Library, 1974).
- 1989 - The Tribute of His Peers: Elegies for Robinson Jeffers (Tor House Press, 1989). ISBN 0-9622774-0-1
- 1991 - Centennial Essays for Robinson Jeffers (University of Delaware Press/ Associated University Presses, 1991). ISBN 0-87413-414-5
- 2009 - The Classic Historians (Linus Publications, 2009) ISBN 1-60797-022-8.

COEDITOR

- 1982–1984 with Richard L. Greaves, Biographical Dictionary of British Radicals in the Seventeenth Century, 3 vols. (Harvester Press, 1982, 1983, 1984).ISBN 0855271337 (vol 1), ISBN 0-7108-0430-X (vol 2), ISBN 0-7108-0486-5 (vol 3).

TRANSLATIONS

- Furies (Hors Commerce Press, 1969). Translated from the Greek of Lili Bita.
- For Empedocles (Ed. EUARCE 1996)
- The Scorpion and Other Stories (Pella, 1998). ISBN 9780918618696. Translated from the Greek of Lili Bita.
- Sister of Darkness (Somerset Hall Press, 2005). ISBN 0-9724661-8-5 Translated from the Greek of Lili Bita.
- Thirty Years in the Rain: The Selected Poetry of Nikiforos Vrettakos (Somerset Hall Press, 2005). ISBN 0-972466-13-4
- Fleshfire (Somerset Hall Press, 2016). ISBN 978-1-935244-14-1 Translated from the Greek of Lili Bita.
- The Bacchae (Somerset Hall Press, 2019). ISBN 978-1-935-244-20-2 Adapted from the Greek of Euripides.

FILMOGRAPHY

- The Art of the Steal (Directed by Don Argott, 2009).

== Honors ==
His honors include the Phi Alpha Theta Prize (1972), the Tor House Foundation Award (1984), and the Lawrence Clark Powell Award (2018). He was a Guggenheim fellow in 1985-86, and is an elected fellow of the Royal Historical Society (1991). He was chair of the Faculty Senate of the University of Miami from 1982 to 1985, was a long-serving member of the Editorial Advisory Board of the Yale Center for Parliamentary History, and was President of the Robinson Jeffers Association (1997–2000).
