= Second Coming Press =

Second Coming Press was a San Francisco-based small press founded by A. D. Winans that was in existence from 1972 to 1989. It specialized in publishing poetry and essays. Its published writers included Douglas Blazek, Charles Bukowski, Neeli Cherkovski, Art Cuelho, Paul Fericano, Gene Fowler, Hugh Fox, Linda King, Diane Kruchkow, Gerald Locklin, Al Masarik, Jack Micheline, Pablo Neruda, Morty Sklar and William Wantling.

Winans also published Second Coming Magazine, broadsides and anthologies.

Second Coming Press' records and related papers are held by the Brown University Library.

== Books published by Second Coming Press ==
- Aguila, Pancho. Dark smoke (1977)
- Andersdatter, Karla Margaret. I don't know whether to laugh or cry, 'cause I lost the map to where I was going: poems (1978)
- Bennett, John. Crime of the Century (1987)
- Castaño, Wilfredo Q. Small stones cast upon the tender earth (1981)
- Fericano, Paul. Loading The Revolver With Real Bullets (1977)
- Fowler, Gene. Felon's Journal (Poems) (1975)
- Fowler, Gene. Return of the Shaman (1981)
- Hiatt, Ben L. Data For a Windy Day (Broadside) (1977)
- Micheline, Jack. Skinny Dynamite (1980)
- Nimnicht, Nora. In the museum naked (1978)
- Reith, Kimi. Poems for my mother and the women I have loved (1978)
- Savitt, Lynne. Lust in 28 flavors: poems (1979)
- Tsongas, George. Love letters (1975)
- Wantling, William. 7 on Style (1975)
- Whitebird, Joanie. Birthmark (1977)
- Whitebird, Joanie. 24 (1978)
- Winans, A.D. North Beach Poems (1977)
- Winans, A.D. Tales of Crazy John: or, Beating Brautigan at His Own Game (1975)

== Anthologies published by Second Coming Press ==
- Winans, A.D. (ed.). 19+?1: An Anthology of San Francisco Poetry (1978)
- Winans, A.D. (ed.). California Bicentennial Poets Anthology (1976)
- Winans, A.D. (ed.). Second Coming Anthology: Ten Years in Retrospect (1984)

== Resources ==
- Brown University Library, Second Coming Press records
