= Laugh Literary and Man the Humping Guns =

Literary magazine

Laugh Literary and Man the Humping Guns was a mimeographed literary magazine published between 1969 and 1971 in Los Angeles, California by Charles Bukowski and Neeli Cherkovski (then known as Neeli Cherry). The original title was to be "Laugh Literary and Man the Fucking Guns," but Cherkovski convinced Bukowski to substitute a less graphic word due to censorship concerns. In the late 1960s, the U.S. Post Office was actively prosecuting publishers for sending "obscene" publications through the mail. At the time of its publication, Bukowski was working as a clerk at the Post Office, having not yet made the transition to full-time writer.

The mimeographed octavo publication was published by Bukowski and Cherkovski's Los Angeles Laugh Literary press. The first edition in 1969 was 32 pages long, stapled inside of yellow printed wrappers; it contained poems, correspondence, and illustrations by Bukowski. Other contributions were by Douglas Blazek, Roger Margolis, Jack Micheline, Steve Richmond, Jerome Rothenberg and Thomas F. Sexton. The cover of the first edition featured a manifesto by Bukowski that railed against Poetry Magazine and "the dull dumpling pattycake safe Creeleys, Olsons, Dickeys, Merwins, Nemerovs and Merediths." Bukowski intended his magazine to be an alternative to Black Mountain Review and its Black Mountain poets, such as Robert Creeley.

According to Howard Sounes' biography Charles Bukowski: Locked in the Arms of a Crazy Life, Bukowski proved a poor editor in this, his second stint at editing a literary magazine. (He had co-edited "Harlequin" with his first wife Barbara Frye in the 1950s.) Upset with the poor quality of the submissions, Bukowski would write insulting remarks to writers who submitted their work, even going so far as deface some of their submissions.

I think that the miracle of our times is that so many people can write down so many words that mean absolutely nothing. Try it sometime. It's almost impossible to write down words that mean absolutely nothing, but they can do it, and they do it continually and relentlessly. I put out 3 issues of a little, Laugh Literary and Man the Humping Guns. The material received was so totally inept that the other editor and myself were forced to write most of the poems. He'd write the first half of one poem, then I'd finish it. Then I'd go the first half of another and he'd finish it. Then we'd sit around and get to the names: "Let's see, whatta we gonna call this cocksucker?"

The "little" literary magazine was part of the 1960s "mimeograph revolution" and helped make Bukowski a well-known poet. Ever the iconoclast, Bukowski denounced the trend. In the May 1973 issue of Small Press Review, he wrote: "... [W]ith the discovery of the mimeo machine everybody became an editor, all with great flair, very little expense and no results at all."

The second edition of the magazine was edited by Bukowski, Cherkovski, and "contributing editor" Harold Norse, a friend of Bukowski who had helped his career by encouraging publishing house Penguin to publish Bukowski in an anthology with him. (Norse's work had appeared in the first issue.) The second issue included the Bukowski poems "The Grand Pricks of the Hob-Nailed Sun" and "I Thought I Was Going to Get Some," as well as some Bukowski illustrations. It is rumored that Bukowski wrote poems under pseudonyms as they were not able to get enough publishable material.

== Sources ==
Bukowski, Charles. Upon the Mathematics of The Breath and the Way, Small Press Review (May 1973). (Bukowski's take on "little" literary magazines and the mimeograph revolution, from)

Sounes, Howard. Charles Bukowski: Locked in the Arms of a Crazy Life (New York: Grove Press, 2000)
