= 1947 in poetry =

Nationality words link to articles with information on the nation's poetry or literature (for instance, Irish or France).

== Events ==
- February 17 – On the death of Montserrat-born British fantasy fiction writer M. P. Shiel, his supposed title to the Kingdom of Redonda passes to London poet John Gawsworth.
- March – Landfall literary magazine is founded by Charles Brasch and first published by Caxton Press (New Zealand); it becomes that country's oldest literary journal.
- May – Dorothy Parker divorces Alan Campbell for the first time.
- November – Muriel Spark becomes editor of Poetry Review in London from this month's issue.

== Works published in English ==
Listed by nation where the work was first published and again by the poet's native land, if different; substantially revised works listed separately:

=== Canada ===
- Arthur Bourinot, The Collected Poems of Arthur S. Bourinot (Toronto: Ryerson Press).
- Paul Hiebert, Sarah Binks, "the sweet songstress of Saskatchewan" [satirical fictional biography of a Prairie poet]
- Archibald Lampman, Selected Poems, edited by Duncan Campbell Scott, published posthumously
- Dorothy Livesay, Poems for People. Toronto: Ryerson. Governor General's Award 1947.
- E. J. Pratt:
  - Behind the Log, Toronto: Macmillan.
  - Ten Selected Poems, Toronto: Macmillan.
- Duncan Campbell Scott, The Circle of Affection, prose and verse
- Raymond Souster, Go To Sleep, World. Toronto: Ryerson.
- John Sutherland, editor, Other Canadians: An Anthology of the New Poetry in Canada, 1940-1946 (First Statement Press, 1947), anthology

=== India, in English ===
- Harindranath Chattopadhyaya, Freedom Come ( Poetry in English ), Bombay: Nalanda Publications
- Serapia Devi, Rapid Visions ( Poetry in English )
- Raul De Loyola Furtado, Selected Poems ( Poetry in English ), second edition, revised; Bombay (first edition 1942; third edition, revised 1967)
- Vinayaka Krishna Gokak, The Song of Life and Other Poems ( Poetry in English ), Bombay: Hind Kitabs
- P. R. Kaikini, Poems of the Passionate East ( Poetry in English ), Bombay
- Fredoon Kabraji, editor, This Strange Adventure: An Anthology of Poems in English by Indians 1828-1946, London: New India Pub. Co., 140 pages; Indian poetry published in the United Kingdom

=== United Kingdom ===
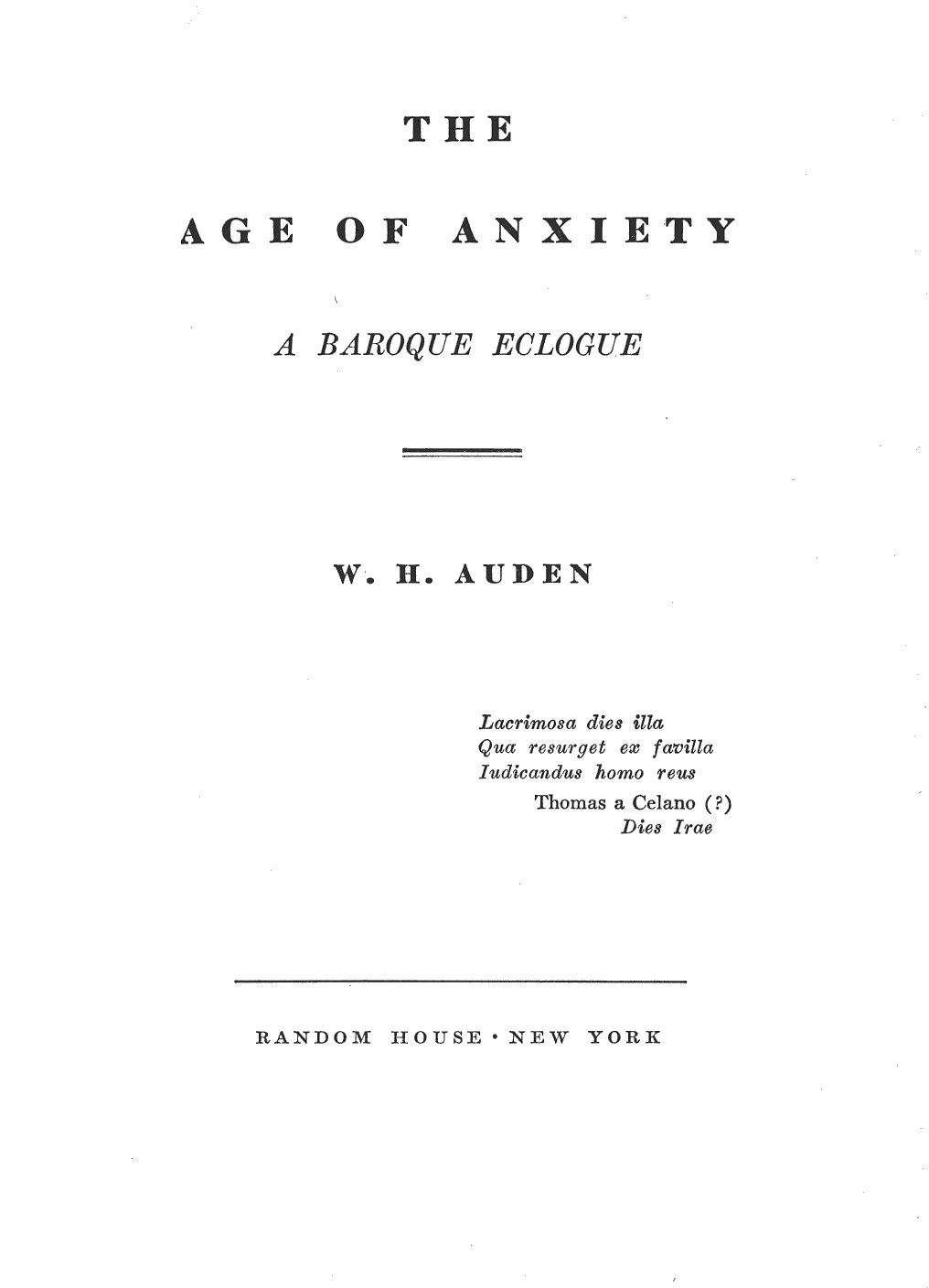
Title page of The Age of Anxiety (1947); Auden specified the typography for this book.

- Kingsley Amis, Bright November
- W. H. Auden, The Age of Anxiety (English native living in the United States)
- John Betjeman, edited by W. H. Auden, Slick But Not Streamlined: poems & short pieces
- Cairo poets, edited by Keith Bullen and John Cromer, Salamander: A Miscellany of Poetry (anthology)
- F. W. Harvey, Gloucestershire: A Selection from the Poems of F. W. Harvey (English poet published in Scotland)
- Hamish Henderson, as Seumas Mor Maceanruig, collected Ballads of World War II
- Patrick Kavanagh, A Soul For Sale
- Philip Larkin, A Girl in Winter
- Laurie Lee, The Bloom of Candles
- Louis MacNeice, The Dark Tower
- John Pudney, Low Life
- Alan Ross, The Derelict Day
- Stephen Spender, Poems of Dedication
- Terence Tiller, Unarm, Eros
- Henry Treece, The Haunted Garden

=== United States ===
- Conrad Aiken, The Kid
- W. H. Auden, The Age of Anxiety, English native living in the United States
- R. P. Blackmur, The Good European
- Cleanth Brooks, The Well Wrought Urn: Studies in the Structure of Poetry
- Witter Bynner, Take Away the Darkness
- John Ciardi, Other Skies
- Louis Coxe, The Sea Faring
- August Derleth, editor, Dark of the Moon: Poems of Fantasy and the Macabre
- Robert Duncan, Heavenly City, Earthly City
- Richard Eberhart, Burr Oaks, including "The Fury of Aerial Bombardment"
- Robert Frost, Steeple Bush
- Jean Garrigue, The Ego and the Centaur
- Langston Hughes, Fields of Wonder
- Weldon Kees, The Fall of Magicians (his second book of poetry)
- Howard Nemerov, The Image of the Law
- John Frederick Nims, The Iron Pastoral
- Kenneth Patchen, Panels for the Walls of Heaven
- Karl Shapiro, Trial of a Poet
- William Jay Smith, Poems
- Wallace Stevens, Transport to Summer (includes "The Pure Good of Theory," "A Word With Jose Rodriguez-Feo," "Description without Place," "The House Was Quiet and the World Was Calm," "Notes Toward a Supreme Fiction," and "Esthetique du Mal"), Knopf
- Richard Wilbur, The Beautiful Changes and Other Poems, New York: Reynal and Hitchcock
- Louis Zukofsky begins writing Bottom: on Shakespeare, a long work of literary philosophy

=== Other in English ===
- Victor Daley, Creeve Roe, posthumously published, Australia
- Donagh MacDonagh, The Hungry Grass, Faber and Faber, Ireland
- Shaw Neilson, Unpublished Poems, edited by James Devaney, Angus and Robertson, Australia

== Works published in other languages ==
Listed by nation where the work was first published and again by the poet's native land, if different; substantially revised works listed separately:

=== France ===
- Guillaume Apollinaire, pen name of Wilhelm Apollinaris de Kostrowitzky, Ombre de mon amour, publisher: P. Cailler Vesenaz (revised edition entitled Poèmes a Lou, 1955), posthumously published (died 1918)
- Antonin Artaud:
  - Artaud le momo Paris: Bordas
  - Ce-git, précédé de la culture indienne, Paris: K Editeur
- André Breton, Ode a Charles Fourier
- Jean Cayrol:
  - Je vivrai l'amour des autres
  - On vous parle, winner of the Prix Renaudot
- Blaise Cendrars, pen name of Frédéric Louis Sauser, a Swiss novelist and poet naturalized as a French citizen in 1916; all of his poetry (which he stopped writing in 1924) was published this year in these two volumes:
  - Du monde entier
  - Au coeur du monde
- Aimé Césaire, Cahier d'un retour au pays natal, expanded edition in book format, Martinique writer
- Jean Follain, Exister
- Eugène Guillevic, Exécutoire, poems written during the German occupation of France
- Pierre Jean Jouve:
  - Hymne
  - Requiem, Lausanne, Switzerland: Mermod, French author published in Switzerland
- Marie Noël, Chants et psaumes d'automne
- Henri Pichette, Apoèmes
- Raymond Queneau, Exercices de style

=== Indian subcontinent ===
Including India, Pakistan, Bangladesh, Sri Lanka and Nepal. Listed alphabetically by first name, regardless of surname:

==== Hindi ====
- Bal Krisna Rav, Kavi ki Chavi
- Kedarnath Agarwal:
  - Nind Ke Badal, written in the language of common people by a notable poet of the Pragativadi movement
  - Yug Ki Ganga, poems in the Pragativadi tradition
- Mishra Dvarika Prasad, epic based on Krishna legends from the Mahabharata, Srimadbhagvata, Sursagar and Sisupalavadha, with contemporary elements; written in 1942 but published this year
- Ram Dahin Mishra, Kavya Darpan, comparing Indian and Western poetics; literary criticism
- Ramadhari Singh Dinkar, Samadheni
- Sumitranandan Pant:
  - Svarn dhuli, a translation of Swami Vivekanand's Song of the Sanyasin into Hindi is included under the title Sanyasi Ke Git
  - Svarna Kiran

==== Marathi ====
- B. B. Borkar, Dudhasagar
- B. S. Mardhekar, Kahi Kavita
- Shanta Shelke, Varsa
- V. R. Kant, Rudravina

==== Oriya ====
- Kalindi Charan Panigrahi, romantic poems by one of the earliest modern poets in Indian literature
- Mayadhar Mansinha:
  - Kamalavana, long, romantic poem
  - Jibanacita, Oriya
- Nityananda Mhapatra, Pancajanya
- Sacchidananda Rout Roy, Pandulipi, poems written in free verse

==== Other languages of the Indian subcontinent ====
- A. Muthusivan, Kavitaiyum Valkkaiyum, literary criticism written in Tamil
- Akhtarul Imam, Sabrang, poems, some allegorical, some satiric, expressing dissatisfaction with traditional society; Urdu
- Amrita Pritam, Lamian Vatan, mostly lyrical poems on romantic love, Punjabi
- Bishnu Dey:
  - Purbalekh, Bengali
  - Bishnu De, Sandiper, Bengali
- Dimbeshwar Neog, Asama; Assamese-language
- Divya Prabha Bharali, Banhi. Aparna, her first book of poetry; Assamese-language
- Dinu Bhai Pant, Vira Gulaba, modern ballad on the heroism and skillfulness of Gulab Singh (later Maharaja Gulab Singh of Jammu and Kashmir), in the battle of Jammu against Sikh invaders; Dogri
- Jhamandas Bhatia, Sain Qutub Sah, biography written in Sindhi of the Sufi poet Qudub Shah, who wrote in that language
- Joseph Mundasseri, Rupabhadrata, literary criticism which found fault with the Marxist school of literary criticism; the debate caused by the book resulted in a split in the progressive literary movement; Malayalam
- Jyotsna Shukla, Azadinan Geeto; Gujarati
- K. S. Narasimha Swamy, Dipadamalli, Kannada
- Kaifi Azmi, pen name of Asar Husain Rizvi, Akhir-i Shab, Urdu
- Kashikanta Mishra, Kobar-git, marriage songs, Maithili
- Manohar Sharma, Aravali Ki Atma, includes nature poems such as "Aravali", "Jharano" and "Tiba", Rajasthani
- Shankara Balakrishna Joshi, also known as "Sam. Ba. Joshi", Karnana Muru Citragulu, literary criticism written in the Kannada language, studying the character of Karna as portrayed in three epics, Mahabharata, Pampa Bharata, and Kumaravyasa Bharata
- Vailoppalli Sridhara Menon, Kannikkoyttu, Malayalam

=== Other languages ===
- Thorkild Bjørnvig, Stærnen bag Gavlen ("The Star Behind the Gable"), Denmark
- Nazik Al-Malaika, Cholera, Arabic-language book published in Iraq
- Alexander Mezhirov, Дорога далеко ("The Road is Long"), edited by Pavel Antokolksy, the author's first published book, Moscow
- Giorgos Seferis, Κίχλη ("The Thrush"), Greek
- Shinoe Shōda, Sange ("Penitence"), tanka anthology about the atomic bombing of Japan, secretly published in defiance of censorship
- Màrius Torres (died 1942), Poesies, Catalan Spanish poet published in Mexico

== Awards and honors ==
- Frost Medal: Gustav Davidson
- Consultant in Poetry to the Library of Congress (later the post would be called "Poet Laureate Consultant in Poetry to the Library of Congress"): Robert Lowell appointed this year.
- Pulitzer Prize for Poetry: Robert Lowell, Lord Weary's Castle
- Fellowship of the Academy of American Poets: Ridgely Torrence
- Canada: Governor General's Award, poetry or drama: Poems for People, Dorothy Livesay
- Australia: Grace Leven Prize for Poetry: Pacific Sea, Nan McDonald

== Births ==
Death years link to the corresponding "[year] in poetry" article:

- January 2
  - Ai (died 2010), American poet (legally changes name from Florence Anthony to Florence Ai Ogawa)
  - David Shapiro, American poet, literary critic and art historian
- January 13 – David Scott (died 2022), English Anglican priest, poet, playwright and spiritual writer
- January 18 – Takeshi Kitano 北野 武, Japanese filmmaker, film editor, screenwriter, comedian, actor, author, poet and painter (surname: Kitano)
- January 22 – Vladimir Oravsky, Swedish author and film director
- February 19
  - Bin Ramke, American poet and editor
  - Lev Rubinstein (died 2024), Russian poet, essayist and social activist
- March 2 – Michael Schmidt, Mexican-born English poet, academic, founder, editor and managing director of Carcanet Press and founder of PN Review
- March 3 – Clifton Snider, American poet, novelist, literary critic, scholar and educator
- April 3 – Srikrishna Alanahalli (died 1989), Indian Kannada novelist and poet
- April 13 – Rae Armantrout, American poet
- April 27 – Astrid Roemer, Suriname-born Dutch poet, novelist and playwright (died 2026)
- May 6 – Jerry Estrin (died 1993), American poet
- May 12 – Penelope Shuttle, English poet
- May 13 – Sukanta Bhattacharya (died 1947), Bengali poet
- May 16 – Cheryl Clarke, American poet and academic
- May 23 – Jane Kenyon (died 1995), American poet and translator
- May 27 – Felix Dennis (died 2014), English publisher and poet
- June 16 – Ellen Bass, American poet
- July 18 – Dermot Healy (died 2014), Irish novelist and poet
- July 25 – Leslie Scalapino (died 2010), American poet
- August 1 – Lorna Goodison, Jamaican poet
- August 8 – Alurista (nom de plume of Alberto Baltazar Urista Heredia), American Chicano poet and activist
- October 13 – Joe Dolce, Australian poet and musician
- October 20 – Mikirō Sasaki 佐々木幹郎, also known as "Mikio Sasaki", Japanese poet and travel writer (surname: Sasaki)
- October 26 – Trevor Joyce, Irish poet
- November 13 – John Steffler, Canadian poet and novelist
- November 30 – Sergio Badilla Castillo, Chilean poet and dramatist
- December 26 – Liz Lochhead, Scottish poet and dramatist
- Also:
  - Michael Casey, American poet
  - Gloria Frym, American poet, fiction writer and essayist
  - Reginald Gibbons, American poet
  - Frank Ormsby, Northern Irish poet
  - Molly Peacock, American poet of the New Formalist school and nonfiction writer
  - Rosemary Sullivan, Canadian poet, biographer and anthologist

== Deaths ==
Birth years link to the corresponding "[year] in poetry" article:

- April 9 – Desmond FitzGerald (born 1888), Irish revolutionary, poet, publicist and politician
- April 12 – C. Louis Leipoldt (born 1880), South African Afrikaans poet, writer and pediatrician
- April 25 – Richard Rowley (born 1877), Northern Irish poet and writer (real name: R. V. Williams)
- April 30 – Anna Wickham (born 1883), English poet (suicide by hanging)
- June 25 – Minnie Gow Walsworth (born 1859), American poet
- July 13 – Yone Noguchi 野口米次郎 (born 1875), Japanese poet, fiction writer, essayist and literary critic in both Japanese and English; father of sculptor Isamu Noguchi
- September 15 – Richard Le Gallienne (born 1866), English poet and writer
- December 19 – Duncan Campbell Scott (born 1862), Canadian poet and writer

== See also ==
- Poetry
- List of poetry awards
- List of years in poetry
