= Phil Weidman =

American poet (1936–2020)

Phil Ernest Herald Weidman (March 22, 1936 – August 16, 2020) was an American poet who wrote nine books of poetry. His first collection, Sixes, was published in 1968.

== Life and career ==
Phil Ernest Herald Weidman was born in Alturas, California on March 22, 1936. A graduate of Chico High School, Weidman served a two-year hitch in the U.S. Army before working as a newspaper reporter. He got his B.A. and master's degree from California State University, Sacramento in 1968 and 1970, respectively.

In addition to his poetry, he worked as a school teacher in the Sacramento area. His poetry has been published in a wide variety of small, prestigious literary magazines, including the Chiron Review, |Hearse, Olé, and the Wormwood Review.

Weidman died at his home in Pollock Pines, California, on August 16, 2020, at the age of 84.

== Sources ==
- Rattlesnake Press: Phil Weidman Bio
