= Ole' (magazine) =

Ole' magazine was one of the first small literary magazines produced by mimeograph to reach a nationwide audience. Published by Sacramento poet and editor Douglas Blazek, Ole' was at the heart of the Mimeo Revolution which saw underground presses publish non-establishment poets who could not get published in mainstream literary magazines such as Poetry Magazine.

== History and profile ==
Ole was founded in 1964. The first edition of the magazine, published by The Mimeo Press of Bensenville, Illinois, was edited by Douglas Blazek. It was "Dedicated to the Cause of Making Poetry Dangerous", and featured three poems by Charles Bukowski ("Watchdog", "Freedom" and "Age"). Bukowski's work would be featured in all eight editions; other contributors were Harold Norse (whose work would be featured in a special issue, Ole' #5 in 1966), Al Purdy, Steve Richmond and William Wantling.

The print runs of each issue were limited to 400 copies, which were individually numbered. Beginning with Issue #5, the publisher became Blazek's own Open Skull Press (some/all printed by Charles Plymell in San Francisco, California, who is featured in many issues), also of Bensenville. Other contributors to Ole' included Bukowski acolyte Neeli Cheery, as well as James Baldwin, Anaïs Nin, William S. Burroughs and William Carlos Williams, all of whom contributed work to the "Harold Norse Special Issue" (#5). The last issue was #7, which was published by Open Skull Press in San Francisco in May 1967.

== See also ==
- List of literary magazines
