= Wormwood Review =

American literary magazine

The Wormwood Review was a literary magazine published from Fall 1959 to April 1999. Alan Kaufman considered the magazine to be "the greatest little magazine of all time."

== History and profile ==
The Wormwood Review was first published in Fall 1959 in Mt. Hope, Connecticut. The founding editors were Alexander (Sandy) Taylor, James Scully, and Morton Felix. It was also edited and published by Marvin Malone. Later, the magazine moved to Stockton, California. Poets published by the magazine included Charles Bukowski, Gregory Corso, e.e. cummings, James Dickey, Jack Micheline, Peter Orlovsky, and William Wantling.

The magazine organized the annual Wormwood Award. The last issue of the Wormwood Review was published in April 1999.

== Notable contributors ==
- Douglas Blazek
- Bertolt Brecht
- Charles Bukowski
- William S. Burroughs
- Neeli Cherkovski
- Gregory Corso
- e.e. cummings
- James Dickey
- Jules Feiffer
- Paul Fericano
- Edsel Ford
- Günter Grass
- Linda King
- Gerald Locklin
- Gerard Malanga
- Al Masarik
- Jack Micheline
- Henry Miller
- Peter Orlovsky
- Ben Pleasants
- Steve Richmond
- James Valvis
- William Wantling
- Charles Harper Webb
- Philip Weidman
