= Starer =

Starer (Hebrew: שטרר; Yiddish: שטארער) is a Jewish surname.

== Notable people ==
- Robert Starer (1924–2001), American composer.
- Jacqueline Starer (born 1940), French Author.
