= Chiron Review =

Chiron Review is a literary journal based in St. John, Kansas. It was founded as The Kindred Spirit in February 1982, by Michael Hathaway shortly after graduating high school and taking a job as typesetter at a local daily newspaper. In March, 1989, the title was changed to Chiron Review.

Jane Hathaway served as assistant editor until her death on Feb. 20, 2000 at age 63. In March 1989, Gerald Locklin became poetry editor and Rafael Zepeda became fiction editor. Dr. Locklin resigned due to health concerns in late 2019, and died Jan. 17, 2021.

In September, 2003, John Brantingham joined the staff as a second editor in fiction, and resigned in December 2020. In March, 2008, Zachary Locklin joined as a second editor in poetry and resigned in 2015. In 2014, Wendy Rainey joined the staff as a poetry editor, Sarah Daugherty as a fiction editor, and Craig Ashby as art director. In 2018, Clint Margrave, Kareem Tayyar, and Grant Hier became poetry editors. Dave Newman joined as a fiction editor and Paul Kareem Tayyar resigned in 2024.

Chiron Review was printed in tabloid newsprint format. It is noted for publishing the widest possible range of contemporary creative writing. It is also known for fostering a sense of "community" in small press circles.

The magazine ceased publication in the fall of 2011, and resumed publication in the fall of 2014 in 6x9 soft cover book format.

Chiron Review published several theme issues. Issue #89 (fall 2009) was a punk rock issue, guest edited by Sarah Daugherty. Issue #26 (spring 1991) was written and edited by Vietnam veterans, edited by Andrew Gettler. There were five all LGBTQ+ issues: #13 (fall 1987); #33 (winter 1992); #50 (spring 1997); #81 (winter 2005), and #128/129 (winter 2022/spring 2023), all edited by Michael Hathaway. A special tribute issue to Gerald Locklin (#127) was published in the fall of 2022, also edited by Michael Hathaway.

Chiron Review's archives [1979-2015] are housed at Beinecke Rare Book and Manuscript Library at Yale University. Later components of the journal's archive are housed at Princeton University Library, Temple University Library, and Kenneth Spencer Research Library at University of Kansas. The journal is indexed by Humanities Index International Complete, Averill Park, NY. Issues 18-81 were indexed by Index of American Periodical Verse.

Chiron Review has published work by authors such as Charles Bukowski, William Stafford, Jan Kerouac, Marge Piercy, James Broughton, Edward Field, Elizabeth Swados, Antler (poet), Richard Kostelanetz, Robert Peters, Lesléa Newman, Lyn Lifshin, D.A. Levy, Charles Harper Webb, Erskine Caldwell, Wilma Elizabeth McDaniel, Janice Eidus, Denise Duhamel, Wanda Coleman, Charles Plymell, S.A. Griffin, Harry Northup, Hugh Fox, A.D. Winans, Clifton Snider, Felice Picano, Will Inman, Michael Xavier, Quentin Crisp, and Alessio Zanelli.
