= Amanda J. Bradley =

American poet, editor, and academic

- Education: MFA in Poetry Writing, The New School; PhD in English and American Literature, Washington University in St. Louis
- Occupations: Poet, editor, academic
- Writing career
- Genres: Poetry, Fiction, essays
- Notable works: Hints and Allegations (2009); Oz at Night (2011); Queen Kong (2017)
- Website: amandajbradley.com

Amanda J. Bradley is an American poet, editor, and academic. She is the author of three poetry collections published by NYQ Books and has served as Poetry Editor of New York Quarterly since 2019.

== Career ==
Bradley's poetry, fiction, and essays have appeared in literary magazines and anthologies including Rattle, Paterson Literary Review, Chiron Review, Gargoyle, The Pedestal Magazine, and Cultural Daily.

Her debut collection, Hints and Allegations (2009), was reviewed in Pif Magazine. Her second book, Oz at Night (2011), was the subject of a HuffPost interview during National Poetry Month. Her third collection, Queen Kong (2017), received a review in The Pedestal Magazine that highlighted its "courageous and audacious" qualities and the poet's awareness of "fierce voices".

Bradley has been nominated for a Pushcart Prize and for Best of the Net. In 2026, one of her poems received an Honorable Mention in the Allen Ginsberg Poetry Awards.

She has taught English and creative writing at the college level for over two decades, including as Associate Professor at Keystone College. She holds an MFA in Poetry Writing from The New School and a PhD in English and American Literature from Washington University in St. Louis.

Bradley has been Poetry Editor of New York Quarterly magazine since 2019. In the spring of 2026, Raymond P Hammond became editor emeritus, and Amanda J Bradley was made editor-in-chief.

== Bibliography ==
- Hints and Allegations (NYQ Books, 2009)
- Oz at Night (NYQ Books, 2011)
- Queen Kong (NYQ Books, 2017)
