= Mimeo Revolution =

1960s technology applied to publishing

The Mimeo Revolution (or Mimeograph Revolution) of the 1960s and 1970s was an active period of small-scale, non-commercial, literary publishing facilitated by the accessibility of the mimeograph and other forms of inexpensive, accessible duplication. It is distinguished from the traditional private press by its emphasis on quick, cheap production.

Presses associated with the Mimeo Revolution often published experimental and underground work, and were important venues for poets, writers and artists ignored by mainstream magazines. Their emphasis was often (but not always) on poetry, including work by the Black Mountain poets, the poets of the Beat Generation, the New York School, and the San Francisco Renaissance, as well as such experimental genres as Concrete Poetry. Unlike mainstream literary magazines, they were usually published by the poets and communities of poets whose work appeared in them.

Significant Mimeo Revolution magazines and presses include 7 Flowers Press, Angel Hair, Beatitude, Big Table, “C” Press, Duende, Floating Bear, Fuck You, L=A=N=G=U=A=G=E, Little Caesar, Ole', Toothpaste, White Rabbit Press, Wormwood Review and Yugen.

== See also ==
- Samizdat
- Alternative newspaper
- Underground comix
