= The Platonic Blow =

Poem by W. H. Auden

"The Platonic Blow, by Miss Oral" (sometimes known as "A Day for a Lay" or "The Gobble Poem") is an erotic poem by W. H. Auden. Thought to have been written in 1948, the poem gleefully describes in graphic detail a homosexual encounter involving an act of fellatio.

== Poem ==
The syncopated poem runs to 34 stanzas of four lines, with an ABAB rhyming scheme. The meter is borrowed from Charles Williams's mystical Arthurian poem Taliessin through Logres. Auden mixes colloquial language with formal expression, using clever internal and external rhymes and half-rhymes. The first verse starts:

It was a spring day, a day for a lay when the air
Smelled like a locker-room, a day to blow or get blown.

== History ==
Auden described writing a "purely pornographic" poem in a letter to Chester Kallman in December 1948, as an addition to the "Auden Corpus." Auden jokingly suggested that Kallman write a similar poem about "the other Major Act" (anal sex) to be published together on "rubber paper for dirty old millionaires" with illustrations by Paul Cadmus. He also wrote the poem to demonstrate his true nature to Professor Norman Holmes Pearson, with whom Auden was collaborating on a poetry anthology.

Copies were circulated to Auden's friends but it remained unpublished until 1965, when Ed Sanders obtained a copy from an employee of the Morgan Library and published it (without Auden's permission) in his New York counterculture magazine Fuck You / A Magazine of the Arts (Vol 5 No 8) in March 1965, with a cover by Andy Warhol. The poem was included without a title, described as "a gobble poem snatched from the notebooks of WH Auden." Auden was furious that the poem had been published without his permission, but admitted his authorship to friends, and in print in the Daily Telegraph Magazine in 1968.

The poem was subsequently published by the European magazine Suck in October 1969, again without permission, under the title "The Gobble Poem," and then by Avante Garde magazine in 1970, entitled "A Day for a Lay." However, by 1970, Auden was denying authorship, and returned the royalty cheque. Notably, the version published in Avant Garde added a third line to stanza eleven, which had been missing from previous printings.

A separate edition of the poem, followed by a scabrous haiku ("My Epitaph"), has been available since 1985 from Orchises Press in Alexandria, Virginia.

The sensual description of a homosexual sex act has been compared to the long 1970s poem "Ode" by Mutsuo Takahashi.
