= Susan Duhan Felix =

American ceramic artist (1937–2023)

- Born: July 23, 1937; Queens, New York, US
- Died: February 4, 2023 (aged 85); Berkeley, California, US
- Occupation: Ceramic artist
- Spouse: Morton Felix

Susan Duhan Felix (July 23, 1937 – February 4, 2023) was an American ceramic artist who lived in Berkeley, California. Felix is well known for creating ceramics using the technique of pit firing. Her art is heavily influenced by spiritual traditions, especially Judaism. J-Weekly reported that Felix “has works in the collections of some highly regarded Jewish institutions: the National Museum of American Jewish History in Philadelphia, the Skirball Cultural Center in Los Angeles, and the Jewish Museum and Tolerance Center in Moscow.”

Felix served as the first Art Ambassador for the City of Berkeley since 2003, advocating for the arts, attending Berkeley art events, and honoring local artists at City Council meetings. The City of Berkeley has twice declared a “Susan D. Felix Day” (March 16, 1989 and June 20, 1999) to honor her work and artistic contribution to the community. On July 23, 2019, the City of Berkeley presented Felix with a Lifetime Achievement Award. She served on the Berkeley Civic Arts Commission from 1983 to 1989 and was president of this organization from 1985 to 1989. In 2018, Felix began hosting Bay Area ArtBeat, a Cable TV program on the arts that airs on Berkeley Community Media (BCM) channel 28.

In 1979, she was a founding member of the Berkeley Cultural Trust, and she continued to serve on the trust. Felix co-founded the Jewish Arts Community of the Bay (JACOB) the same year and served as executive director from 1989 to 1991.

In addition to being an internationally renowned artist, Felix was also a housing activist. In 1979–1999, she served as the first executive director of University Avenue Housing Inc. (also known as UAH), a nonprofit in Berkeley creating low-income housing that was awarded the 1991 Berkeley Peace Prize and was one of the model projects of the Red Cross. UAH is also in the San Francisco Department of Housing and Urban Development Hall of Fame. In 1999, Felix received a Certificate of Special Congressional Recognition by Congresswoman Barbara Lee to recognize her service to the community and “honor more than 20 years of service as a non-profit housing developer.” She developed over 120 units of affordable housing in the San Francisco Bay Area.

== Biography ==
Susan Duhan Felix was born in Queens, New York to Eliot Duhan, a physician, and Evelyn Silverman Duhan, a high school Latin teacher. Susan is the oldest of four children. During her childhood, her family lived in a low-income neighborhood, and her father offered medical assistance to many people free of charge.

Susan married the poet Morton Felix in 1957, and in 1959, their daughter Lisa was born. In 1959, Morton, Susan, and other poets in Storrs, Connecticut started the Wormwood Review, a poetry journal. From 1965 to 1966 she taught ceramics to students from low-income families at the Thomas A. Doyle School in Providence, Rhode Island. She moved to Berkeley in 1967 and taught at Arts and Crafts Cooperative Incorporated (ACCI) from 1968 to 1978. Felix has served as the Art Commission representative on the Waterfront Advisory Committee, as well as on the State/Local Partnership Advisory Committee of the Alameda Art Commission. Felix was instrumental in the construction of the Peace Wall in the Martin Luther King Jr. Civic Park. She has also been a member of the San Francisco East Bay Aquarian Minyan, a Jewish Renewal community. Felix helped establish the first center for peace in Providence, Rhode Island. In 1993, Felix was honored by the Berkeley Commission on the Status of Women as an outstanding woman of Berkeley. She has been a member of the Association of Clay and Glass Artists of California and showed her work in the San Francisco Clay & Glass Festival in 2000. In 2017, Felix celebrated 60 years of creating art with a solo retrospective exhibit at the Graduate Theological Union Library in Berkeley.

Felix was also a dancer and poet. She was the dancer in the Simcha Orchestra in the 1980s and has participated many times in the “Dance Anywhere!” global celebration. She has led group dance for a variety of public events, including at the Contemporary Jewish Museum and the Northern California Community for Humanistic Judaism. She has also led workshops on spiritual poetry and meditation at Rancho La Puerta in Mexico. She has read her poems at a number of venues, including Po’ Jazz at Cornelia Street Café in New York and the Monticello Inn Library in San Francisco.

Felix died in Berkeley, California, on February 4, 2023, at the age of 85.

== Education ==
In 1958, Felix earned a Bachelor of Arts in English Literature from Queens College in New York. In 1961, she earned a Master of Arts in Spiritual Poetry from the University of Connecticut, Storrs.

== Exhibitions and Installations ==
Felix has displayed her work at the following one-person regime shows:

2017	"Creation: A Susan Duhan Felix Retrospective," Graduate Theological Union Library, Berkeley, CA
2015	Cafe Leila, Berkeley, CA
2013-2014	"From Pain Comes Newness," Liz Filmer Gallery, Berkeley, CA
2012-2013	"Susan Duhan Felix: Then & Now," Jewish Heritage Museum, Danville, CA
2012	Chochmat HaLev Gallery, Berkeley, CA
2009	"Mystery Made Manifest," Bade Museum, Berkeley, CA
2008	"Flamed Earth: The Ritual Objects of Susan Duhan Felix," Houston Center for Contemporary Craft, Houston, TX
2007	"Flamed Earth: The Ritual Objects of Susan Duhan Felix," Hebrew Union College-Jewish Institute of Religion Museum, New York, NY
2005	"Wholly Grace: The Work of Susan Duhan Felix," Bade Museum, Berkeley, CA
1997	"Lights and Vessels solo show," Half Moon Bay Library, Half Moon Bay, CA
1993	"Solo Show," University of Delaware, Newark, DE
1987	Berkeley Art Center, Berkeley, CA
1986	"Darkness to Light: Ceramic Sculpture by Susan Felix," Judah L. Magnes Museum, Berkeley, CA
1983	"…Visions and Revisions…" Gallery of the Oakland Art Association, Oakland, CA
