= Hunting the Snark =

- First edition cover
- Author: Robert Peters
- Language: English
- Genre: Poetry
- Publisher: Paragon House
- Publication date: 1989
- Publication place: United States
- Pages: 396 pp
- ISBN: 1-55778-052-8

Hunting the Snark is a compendium of poetic terminology that mirrored American contemporary poetry of nineteen seventies and eighties written by Robert Peters. The book sorts through contemporary American poems, separating them into nearly a hundred categories. The book's foreword is written by founder of the New York Quarterly, William Packard. He says, “Hunting the Snark is an extraordinarily well-informed, joyous encomium to poetry itself. It displays the variety and diversity of our contemporary American scene.”

== Classifications and terminology ==
His classifications are concepts like: "Sylvia Plath Poems", "Wise Child poems", "Snapshot Poems", "Academic Sleaze", "Fruits-and-Flower-Poems", "Ezra Pound poems", "Jazz Poems", "Self-Pity Poems", "West Coast Poems".

== Title ==
The title is a reference to Lewis Carroll’s poem "The Hunting of the Snark".

== Passel of Poets ==
Peters anthologizes in Hunting the Snark a comprehensive amount of poets and their poems including widely noted poets such as Robert Hass, Billy Collins, Denise Levertov, Adrienne Rich, John Ashbery to obscure noted poets Wilma McDaniel, Paul Vangelisti, David Ray and Alfred Starr Hamilton.

== Sources ==
On the Trico libraries news and notes web, library associate Evelyn Khoo chose the Hunting of the Snark as “Curious, Useful, Edifying, Inspiring: The Reference Books of McCabe Library". Khoo assesses the book as a book that replaces the standard poetry anthologies with the usual geographic or chronological format for most reference works, with classifications like "academic sleaze", "poultry poems", "bent genes poems", and "Disney poems".

Each category has a selection of classic and contemporary poets, which embody the spirit of each genre, tied together with Peters' critical analysis.

Poet and noted biographer of Sylvia Plath Edward Butcher wrote an essay on Peters, stating that he "fairly categorized terminologically American poems and poets with his original poetic terminology".
