= Clifton Snider =

American writer and educator (1947–2021)

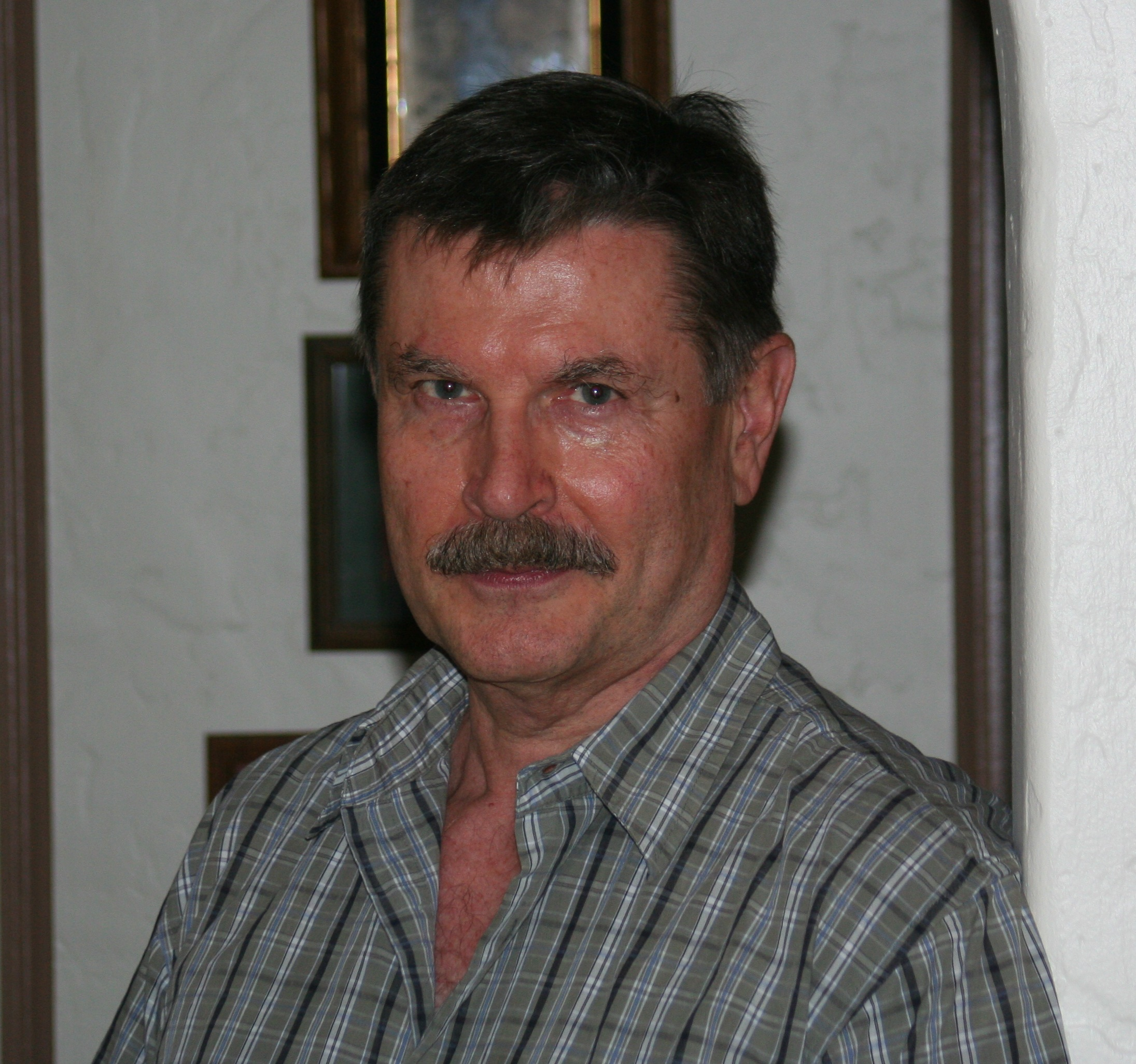
- Snider in 2011
- Born: Clifton Mark Snider; March 3, 1947; Duluth, Minnesota, U.S.
- Died: October 24, 2021 (aged 74)
- Education: California State University, Long Beach (BA, MA); University of New Mexico (PhD)
- Occupations: Poet; novelist; educator
- Writing career
- Genres: Fiction, poetry

Clifton Mark Snider (March 3, 1947 – October 24, 2021) was an American poet, novelist, literary critic, scholar, and educator.

== Early life ==
Clifton Snider was born in Duluth, Minnesota, the second of five sons. His father, Allan G. Snider, was a minister with the Assemblies of God denomination. His mother, Rhoda M. Tout, had traveled as an evangelist with Olga Olsson before her marriage to Allan Snider. Because the father was a minister, the family moved frequently. By the age of twelve, Snider had lived in Minnesota; Joliet, Illinois; Terre Haute, Indiana; and several cities in southern California.

He had a B.A. and an M.A. from California State University, Long Beach, and a Ph.D. from the University of New Mexico. He taught at various institutions of higher education in southern California, primarily at Long Beach City College and at California State University, Long Beach.

Snider died on October 24, 2021, at the age of 78.

== Critic and scholar ==
He went to Southern California College (an Assemblies of God institution now called Vanguard University) on music and academic scholarships. After two years, he transferred to California State University, Long Beach, where he finished his B.A., graduating with honors in 1969, and his M.A. (1971). He received his Ph.D. in English Literature in 1974 from the University of New Mexico. Snider's doctoral dissertation is a Jungian analysis of Swinburne's Tristram of Lyonesse, and he has published numerous articles on Victorian literature, as well as twentieth century English and American literatures. These include introductions to Jungian psychology (or Analytical Psychology) and criticism, histories of Merlin in 19th-century British literature, as well as such authors as W. H. Auden, Emily Dickinson, Edward Lear, Carson McCullers, Algernon Charles Swinburne, Oscar Wilde, and Virginia Woolf. A specialist in Wilde, he has taught his own seminars on him at California State University, Long Beach, and published several articles on Wilde using his primary critical approaches of Jungian and Queer Criticism. He also taught the first course ever on Gays and Lesbians in Literature at Cal State Long Beach. His book, The Stuff That Dreams Are Made On: A Jungian Interpretation of Literature, contains a chapter on Wilde. His latest article uses Jungian and Queer Criticism to examine Brokeback Mountain, story and film, and appears in the Jungian journal, Psychological Perspectives, January, 2008.

Snider's shorter pieces of criticism have appeared in many periodicals, among them The Advocate, the Long Beach Press-Telegram, and the Los Angeles Times. In the early 1980s he was a contributing editor for the Maelstrom Review.

== Activism ==
A political/peace activist, Snider has posted poems on the national web site, Poets Against the War, and maintains his own web page, A Poet Against the War, on which he has posted some of his own poetry. The page includes many news items, photos, and links regarding the war in Iraq, not the least of which are statistics of the dead and wounded and information about the slaughter in Iraq of academics and gay people. He has served as an officer in the Long Beach Lambda Democratic Club.

In the midst of the presidential election during the fall semester of 2004 at Cal State Long Beach, Snider became involved in a national controversy over academic freedom when two of his students, a young woman and a young man, went on Fox News to complain about Snider's comments the first night of a freshman composition class. Because his emphasis in a class that is supposed to promote critical thinking about controversial issues was on morality and spirituality, Snider used the war in Iraq as an example of immorality. He invited any student who disagreed to say so, and these two did. A number of others in the class agreed with Snider. Fox News, however, and a number of other right-wing commentators, responding to a complaint by the female student on David Horowitz's site, Students for Academic Freedom, concentrated on Snider's argument paper topics and his book list for a book review, both of which were perceived as biased (the student said the list had "a dominant theme: Sexual [sic] perversion and anti Bush [sic] rhetoric"). The homophobic drumbeat was picked up by other sites, such as Agape Press.

The hate mail and death threats were such that for a time Snider received police protection while teaching that class ("Attack of the Killer Hipublicans," Whole Life Times). The student became a spokesperson for Horowitz, writing numerous articles for right-wing blogs and other web sites and appearing again on national television on Paul Gigot's The Journal Editorial Report on September 23, 2005, which at that time was on PBS. Not allowed to respond to his former student's accusations on the Gigot program or on its web site, Snider, who had felt constrained by his employer to keep silent, finally told his side of the story on Insidehighered.com. His former student was claiming Snider had been unfair to her by giving her a "B" on a paragraph she wrote on the film Fahrenheit 9/11 when she had been achieving a "straight-A record" in the class. Snider wrote he had "the grade book" for the class which proved she was not telling the truth. Neither she nor Horowitz ever contested what Snider said, and indeed neither she nor the male student ever followed university policy regarding complaints against professors.

== Career as a poet and critical reception ==
All of Snider's books of poetry, fiction, and literary criticism have been critically acclaimed. Cadence Collective has called him "one of the most magnificent and prolific poets of our time." His first chapbook, Jesse Comes Back (1976), was followed by the elegiac Bad Smoke Good Body (1980), written for the poet's older brother, Evan, who had disappeared under circumstances indicating foul play in October 1976. The loss of his older brother, who was gay, as is Snider, has run through Snider's work through the years, culminating in the frankly autobiographical novel, Wrestling with Angels: A Tale of Two Brothers (2001). Indeed, Snider uses each of the twelve poems from Bad Smoke as epigraphs for each of the twelve chapters of the novel.

Snider's criticism and poetry have been translated into Russian, French, Spanish, and Arabic, and his poetry, fiction, and criticism have been published around the world in countries as diverse as Algeria, Canada, England, France, Ireland, and the United States. Much of his work concerns the foreign places he's visited, and though his home is Long Beach, California, the spiritual core of his poetry is often centered in New Mexico, with its rich mixture of Native, Hispanic, and Anglo cultures. In New Mexico he has held a number of residence grants at the Helene Wurlitzer Foundation, Taos. (Other residence grants he has held have been at Yaddo, Saratoga Springs, New York, and the Karolyi Foundation, Vence, France.) In addition to drawing on his own Christian roots for his work, Snider also draws on a multitude of other religious/spiritual traditions, from Native American to East Indian, African, and Nordic peoples, myths, and legends. Of particular interest are his poems about the Paleolithic European caves of Niaux and Pech-Merle. Robert Peters examines Snider's work in a chapter titled "Poems for an Autobiography" in The Great American Poetry Bake-off (1987).

In 1986 at The Works Gallery, Long Beach, California, Out Theater produced as its premier production Edwin: A Performance Art Event, based on Snider's book, Edwin: A Character in Poems (1984), and his one-act play, A Little Get-Together.

Although, with the exception of Bad Smoke Good Body, Snider's early books focused on characters he invented, fellow Long Beach poet and critic Gerald Locklin maintains in Western American Literature that Snider's fifth book of poems, Blood & Bones (1988), "completes, with the dropping of the 'Jesse' and 'Edwin' personae, [Snider's] transition from modern to postmodern artist. The confidence he now exhibits renders accessible to artistic use a rich though often painful personal history." Of the same book, Richard Labonte writes in the national gay and lesbian magazine, The Advocate: "Southern California poet Clifton Snider explores the unexpected, the near tragic, and the adventurous. In three sections, he writes of a trip through Europe in the '70s, of his sudden hospitalization with a bleeding ulcer, and of his return to travel in Europe in the mid '80s. Poems of the first trip are soaked with the blood oozing into his guts; poems of the second trip reflect good health, a good eye, and maturity. The contrast is appealing; the poems, beguiling."

Impervious to Piranhas (1989), the chapbook that followed Blood & Bones, collects poems, early and late, which Snider had not found places for in his earlier collections. The Age of the Mother (1992), the full-length book that Snider published next, was praised by Glenn Bach ("In these beautifully spare words, Snider weaves personal mantras of birth, death, and transcendence. He announces the return of the Goddess after centuries of patriarchal dominance," Small Press Review) and Marilyn Johnson ("Out of ... profound insight and spiritual wisdom he ... has created an offering, a magnificent poetic vision, a prayer-book for the coming New Age," Pearl).

His collection of poems, The Alchemy of Opposites (2000), has received the greatest praise of Snider's fairly lengthy career. Eva von Kesselhausen, for example, writes in the Small Press Review: "Clifton Snider has been writing and publishing for over 25 years to establish himself as one of American's best . . . contemporary poets. The Alchemy of Opposites . . . stands as his most outstanding book to date . . . [with] poignant poetry which is highly crafted and easy to read." And in the International Gay and Lesbian Review, Arnold T. Schwab declares, "The Alchemy of Opposites is Clifton Snider's . . . best work in verse, his most personal and moving"; Schwab also admires "Snider's emotional directness and the admirable accessibility of his imagery. . . . The Alchemy of Opposites indeed contains outcroppings of pure gold." Two poems from this collection, "Le Mont Saint- Michel" and "Honey from Heaven," won "In the Spotlight" awards from the online magazine, The Poetry Page, in 1999.

Snider published his collection of poems, Aspens in the Wind, in 2009. His much-anticipated career retrospective, covering his 40 years of publishing history, Moonman: New and Selected Poems, came out from World Parade Books in the spring of 2012. In the national online journal, Lambda Literary, Tony Leuzzi writes, "Moonman traces Snider's fluid movement from one idiom to another: restrained poems in traditional forms; intellectual utterances that demonstrate his awareness of Western and Eastern philosophical systems; chatty, casual poems that respond to aspects of popular culture; and, most impressively, concise and memorable imagist verse. . . . [In Edwin: A Character in Poems] the persona functions as an effective objective correlative whose dual obsessions with thought and body echo a whole generation of gay men. . . . [Other poems] are lit with a delirious, visionary glow."

On July 7, 2018, Snider was awarded the inaugural Lorde-Whitman Award for "outstanding achievement in the arts and service to the LGBTQ community" from OUT LOUD: A Cultural Evolution, Long Beach, California.

On October 24, 2021, Snider suffered a fatal heart attack as he was hiking with a group, in Athens, Greece. He is commemorated by his brother, Merlin Snider, on social media, who stated that "…our circle in this plane is complete with love and without regret."

== Novels ==
In 2000-2001 Snider published in rapid succession three novels he had written in the 1980s: Loud Whisper, Bare Roots, and Wrestling with Angels: A Tale of Two Brothers. All were well received by the critics in journals such as the International Gay and Lesbian Review, Sexuality and Culture: An Interdisciplinary Quarterly, and Chiron Review. The latter two novels are autobiographical stories about the coming of age and coming out of sensitive young men with deep Christian fundamentalist roots. Loud Whisper chronicles the frontman for an 80's rock band who, drunk and drugged out, falls from stage during a concert and becomes paralyzed. As always, Snider is concerned with spiritual decline and revitalization. Through the eyes of the frontman, Adam, his band members, his male and female lovers, and a journalist doing a story on him, Adam's spiritual and physical struggles unfold.

A long-time lecturer at Cal State Long Beach, Snider retired in 2009. His first historical novel, The Plymouth Papers, was published by Spout Hill Press in February, 2014. The short novel examines the relationships between the 17th-century English settlers of Plymouth Colony and the native peoples they encountered, with a frame character from the 19th century who discovers the papers.

Snider continued to write poetry, fiction, and criticism until his death. His full curriculum vitae is available on his own university web site.

== Bibliography ==
=== Poetry ===
- Jesse Comes Back (1976)
- Bad Smoke Good Body (1980)
- Jesse and His Son (1982)
- Edwin: A Character in Poems (1984)
- Blood & Bones (1988)
- Impervious to Piranhas (1989)
- The Age of the Mother (1992)
- The Alchemy of Opposites (2000)
- Aspens in the Wind (2009)
- Moonman: New and Selected Poems (2012)
- The Beatle Bump (2016)
- Stubborn Heart: New Poems (2021)

=== Novels ===
- Loud Whisper (2000)
- Bare Roots (2001)
- Wrestling with Angels: A Tale of Two Brothers (2001)
- The Plymouth Papers (2014)

=== Literary criticism ===
- The Stuff That Dreams Are Made On: A Jungian Interpretation of Literature (1991)
