= Bob Kaufman =

American writer (1925–1986)

- Born: Robert Garnell Kaufman; April 18, 1925; New Orleans, Louisiana US
- Died: January 12, 1986 (aged 60); San Francisco, California US
- Occupation: Poet
- Spouses: Eileen Singe
- Writing career
- Years active: 1958–1986

Robert Garnell Kaufman (April 18, 1925 – January 12, 1986) was an American Beat poet and surrealist as well as a jazz performance artist and satirist. In France, where his poetry had a large following, he was known as the Black American Rimbaud.

In 1959, with poets Allen Ginsberg, John Kelly, A. D. Winans, and William Margolis, he was one of the founders of Beatitude, a poetry magazine, where he worked as an editor.

== Early life and education ==
Born in New Orleans, Kaufman was the 10th of 13 children. His paternal grandfather was a German Jew, and his mother was from an established Black, Roman Catholic New Orleans family. At the age of 18, Kaufman joined the United States Merchant Marine. His last voyage was in 1949. He studied at New York City's The New School for Social Research. In New York City he met William S. Burroughs and Allen Ginsberg; however, Ginsberg has said he did not meet Kaufman until 1959. He also knew the photographer Robert Frank in New York in the late 1940s.

== Career ==
During Kaufman's time at The New School and in New York City, he found inspiration in the writings of Herman Melville, Walt Whitman, Arthur Rimbaud, Guillaume Apollinaire, Federico García Lorca, Hart Crane, Gertrude Stein, Langston Hughes, Frantz Fanon, Aimé Césaire, and Nicolás Guillén. He also identified with the works of jazz musicians and improvisational artists such as Charlie Parker, whom he named his son after.

Kaufman moved to San Francisco's North Beach in 1958 and remained there for most of the rest of his life.

Kaufman frequently expressed his desire to be forgotten as both a writer and a person. Kaufman, a poet in the oral tradition, usually didn't write down his poems, and much of his published work survives by way of his wife Eileen, who wrote his poems down as he conceived them. City Lights published several books of Kaufman's poems during his lifetime, however, including Abomunist Manifesto, Second April in 1959, and Does the Secret Mind Whisper in 1960. In 1981 Kaufman published The Ancient Rain: Poems 1956 to 1978 with New Directions Publishing. He apparently did write his poems down on empty sacks and odd sheets of paper.

Although he was baptized at age 35 while in the Merchant Marines (Cherkovski, xxxiii), like many beat writers, Kaufman became a Buddhist.

According to the writer Raymond Foye, Kaufman is the person who coined the term "beatnik", and his life was filled with a great deal of suffering. In San Francisco, he was the target of beatings and harassment by the city police, and his years living in New York were filled with poverty, addiction, and imprisonment. Kaufman often incurred the wrath of the local police simply for reciting his poetry aloud in public, and it is alleged that, at the height of the "beatnik" fad, he was arrested by the San Francisco police on disorderly charges 39 times.

In 1959, Kaufman had a small role in a movie called The Flower Thief, which was shot in North Beach by Ron Rice. In 1960, he was invited to read at Harvard and moved to New York City, giving readings at The Gaslight Café, The Paperback Book Gallery and The Living Theater. He was arrested in November of that year and taken to Bellevue Hospital. On his release, Kaufman lived in the same building as Allen Ginsberg, where he met Timothy Leary in January 1961, and took psilocybin with Jack Kerouac, apparently for the first time.

In 1961, Kaufman was nominated for England's Guinness Poetry Award, but lost to T. S. Eliot. In 1962, he was in court for an alleged assault at the nightclub Fat Black Pussycat and imprisoned on Riker's Island. While he was on Riker's, Eileen and Parker, Kaufman's infant son, returned to San Francisco. In 1963, when he was to depart New York, he was arrested for walking on the grass of Washington Square Park and incarcerated on Rikers Island, then sent as a "behavioral problem" to Bellevue Psychiatric Hospital where he underwent electro-shock treatments, which greatly affected his already bleak outlook on society. He took a vow of silence after the assassination of John F. Kennedy, which lasted 10 years. He was believed to return to this silence in the early 1980s, but he was filmed reading his poem The Poet at the San Francisco Art Institute in 1981. In September 1981, he was awarded a grant from the National Endowment for the Arts. In 1982, he gave a benefit reading of his poetry for Beatitude magazine at the Savoy Tivoli. In 1984, he appeared in a documentary West Coast: Beat and Beyond, and in 1985, he gave a benefit reading in North Beach, again for Beatitude.

He died in 1986 of cirrhosis and emphysema.

== Remembrance ==
In an interview, Ken Kesey described seeing Bob Kaufman on the streets of San Francisco's North Beach during a visit to that city with his family in the 1950s:

I can remember driving down to North Beach with my folks and seeing Bob Kaufman out there on the street. I didn't know he was Bob Kaufman at the time. He had little pieces of Band-Aid tape all over his face, about two inches wide, and little smaller ones like two inches long -- and all of them made into crosses. He came up to the cars, and he was babbling poetry into these cars. He came up to the car I was riding in, and my folks, and started jabbering this stuff into the car. I knew that this was exceptional use of the human voice and the human mind.

== Poetry ==
His poetry made use of jazz syncopation and meter. The critic Raymond Foye wrote "Adapting the harmonic complexities and spontaneous invention of bebop to poetic euphony and meter, he became the quintessential jazz poet." He frequently used jazz and bebop metaphors in his poems:

One thousand saxophones infiltrate the city
Each with a man inside,
Hidden in ordinary cases,
Labeled FRAGILE.'

From "Battle Report"

Poet Jack Micheline said "I found his work to be essentially improvisational, and was at its best when accompanied by a jazz musician. His technique resembled that of the surreal school of poets, ranging from a powerful, visionary lyricism of satirical, near dadaistic leanings, to the more prophetic tone that can be found in his political poems."

Kaufman said "My head is a bony guitar, strung with tongues, plucked by fingers & nails."

After learning of the assassination of John F. Kennedy, Kaufman took a Buddhist vow of silence that lasted until the end of the Vietnam War in 1973. He broke his silence by reciting his poem "All Those Ships that Never Sailed," the first lines of which are:

All those ships that never sailed
The ones with their seacocks open
That were scuttled in their stalls...
Today I bring them back
Huge and intransitory
And let them sail
Forever

According to George Fragopoulis, in his article "Singing the Silent Songs": "It is generative to consider Kaufman's silence as a kind of poetic project in and of itself, a gesture meant to interrogate the lyric's possibilities of reimagining our relationships with the world. The history of modern poetry cannot be told without including those poets (Rimbaud, Paul Valéry, Laura (Riding) Jackson, Robert Duncan, George Oppen) who renounced poetry." (p. 152).

== Personal life ==
In 1944, Kaufman married Ida Berrocal. They had one daughter, Antoinette Victoria Marie (Nagle), born in New York City in 1945 (died 2008). He married Eileen Singe (1922–2015) in 1958; they had one child, Parker.

== Bibliography ==
- Abomunist Manifesto (broadside) (City Lights, 1958). In 2013 Temática Editores Generales in Lima published Manifiesto Abomunista, a bilingual Spanish-English version.(All Libraries)
- Second April (broadside) (City Lights, 1958) (All Libraries)
- Does the Secret Mind Whisper? (broadside) (City Lights, 1959) (All Libraries)
- Solitudes Crowded with Loneliness (New Directions, 1965) (All Libraries)
- Golden Sardine (City Lights, 1967) (All Libraries)
- The Ancient Rain: Poems 1956–1978 (New Directions, 1981) (All Libraries)
- Cranial Guitar: Selected Poems by Bob Kaufman (Coffee House Press, 1996)(All Libraries)
- Collected Poems of Bob Kaufman (City Lights Publishers, 2019)
