= Linda King =

American sculptor, playwright and poet (born 1940)

Linda King (born 1940) is an American sculptor, playwright and poet. She is best known for having been the girlfriend of American writer Charles Bukowski for several years in the early 1970s.

== Personal life ==
Born in 1940, King grew up in Boulder, Utah. She first married early in life, divorcing after 10 years. During the 1970s, King edited the literary magazine, Purr. King was an actress before she became a sculptor and poet. King has two children.

== Relationship With Charles Bukowski ==
In 1970, shortly after the end of her marriage, King met Charles Bukowski and offered to make a sculpture of his head. He accepted her offer, and they soon became romantically involved. King was 30 years old and Bukowski was about 20 years her senior when they started their relationship. The relationship has been documented as volatile, turbulent and even physically abusive. On one occasion in 1971, Bukowski broke her nose during an argument. On another occasion, King and Bukowski were accommodated at the City Lights apartment in San Francisco, after a reading at the City Lights Poets Theater. By the following morning there was a broken window and a panel smashed in the door, and King had disappeared. Bukowski blamed her for the damage.

Bukowski's stage debut was as an actor in King’s play Only a Tenant in which she and Bukowski stage-read the first act at the Pasadena Museum of the Artist.

Bukowski and King finally split up for good in 1975, when one night an intoxicated King threw Bukowski's typewriter and books onto the street, angry at his infidelities. The incident is detailed in Bukowski's novel Women, whose leading character, Lydia Vance, is based on King. The same year, King left Los Angeles for Phoenix, because of what she described as "one extended nervous breakdown".

She said of their relationship:

It wasn't that he had other women. It's that he always wanted me to know about them, always wanted to tell me all the details about what they did together. Who does that unless they really want to make you mad?

== After Bukowski ==
King remarried and had a third child. The marriage also ended in divorce. She worked as a bartender, waitress, and a part-time care-giver for the elderly. She sold her own traditional portrait busts in clay, and published poems. One in particular, printed in 1997, references Bukowski: "I am the woman who knows for sure that Bukowski's balls were bigger I am the woman who knows that he liked hot chilies in his stew".

In 2004, Phoenix's Paper Heart Gallery featured her paintings, busts and poems, along with documentary films about Bukowski, in a show entitled Friends and Foes of Charles Bukowski.

In 2009, she sold 60 love letters written to her by Bukowski at auction in San Francisco's PBA Galleries. The same year, in order to be nearer to her grandchildren, King moved from Phoenix into an apartment in the Sunset District of San Francisco. In September 2009, she was one of the three poets in the presentation Tales of Bukowski & the Late 1960s LA Poetry Scene: A Reading & Report by Key Poet/Participants at Bird & Beckett Books & Records in San Francisco.

In addition to her bust of Bukowski, King also sculpted busts of Lawrence Ferlinghetti, Jack Micheline, Harold Norse, and A. D. Winans. Her play Singing Bullets was staged as part of a showcase by Phoenix's Metro Arts Institute.

King has also sold an edition of at least 15 bronzes of Bukowski.

== Bibliography ==
King wrote a memoir, Loving and Hating Charles Bukowski (2012; revised 2014). She also has written seven collections of poetry:

- Curled Inside the Curve of His Body…
- I Danced With a Man Last Night
- The Elephant Chronicles
- Exposed
- The Savageness of My Discontent
- Sweet and Dirty
- The World is Not What I Thought

Her poetry has been published in a wide variety of magazines, including The Bukowski Review and Wormwood Review.
