= Jacqueline Starer =

French author and translator

Jacqueline Starer (born 1940) is a former English professor.

== Early life ==
She was born in Paris in 1940. After studying French and Classics at the Sorbonne, she met English poet Keith Barnes (1934–1969) in Paris in 1963. Together they left for the United States where she taught at University of California, Berkeley and Bard College) and discovered American Poetry. After Barnes's death in Paris, she returned to the United States where she wrote her thesis on the writers of the Beat Generation (directed by Roger Asselineau at the Sorbonne).

== Career ==
In 1976, she returned to Paris and became involved in International Cooperation in Cultural Affairs. She translated Barnes' poetic work into French, with Michèle Duclos, as well as poems of the Japanese poet Shizue Ogawa. She was a representative for Le Journal des Poètes (Brussels) in France (2006–2012). She authored five books: on writers of the Beat Generation, on Keith Barnes, and on the life of French people in the Paris area at the end of the 20th century.

== Bibliography ==
- Les Écrivains beats et le voyage and Chronologie des écrivains beats jusqu’en 1969, (checked by Carolyn Cassady, Gregory Corso, Lawrence Ferlinghetti, Allen Ginsberg, Eileen Kaufman and Gary Snyder), Marcel Didier, Paris, 1977
- K.B. (with a selection of poems by Keith Barnes translated into French), éditions Maurice Nadeau, Paris, 1987
- Les Bougons, La Bartavelle (Collection romans et prose), 2002
- Keith Barnes Œuvre poétique Collected Poems, opening by Maurice Nadeau, éditions d’écarts, Paris, 2003
- K.B. KEITH BARNES, bilingual edition, English Translation by Helen McPhail, éditions d’écarts, Dol-de-Bretagne, 2007.
- Translation from the English, with Michèle Duclos, of Une Âme qui joue, Choix de poèmes by Shizue Ogawa, éditions de la Maison Internationale de Poésie – Arthur Haulot, Bruxelles, 2010, Prix international de poésie Antonio Viccaro 2010
- Les Écrivains de la Beat Generation (including the Chronologie jusqu’en 1969), éditions d’écarts, F-35120 Dol de Bretagne, 2011
