= Eileen Kaufman =

American writer

- Born: Eileen Singe; 1922
- Died: 2015 (aged 92–93)
- Spouse: Bob Kaufman (1958–1986)

Eileen Kaufman née Eileen Singe (1922–2015) was an American poet and journalist. She served in the United States Navy during World War II. In 1958 she married the Beat poet Bob Kaufman (1925–1986). It was her second marriage. She helped her husband establish the literary magazine Beatitude. She also worked as an editor on the magazine. Kaufman also wrote down Bob Kaufman's spoken verse and assembled the poems into the book Solitudes Crowded with Loneliness, which was published in 1965 by New Directions Publishing.

The Kaufmans had a troubled marriage with several separations. At one point, Eileen Kaufman moved from New York to San Francisco without her husband and wrote for publications including the Los Angeles Free Press and Billboard magazine, covering music.

Portions of Kaufman's unpublished autobiography appeared in the book Women of the Beat Generation edited by Brenda Knight.
