= A. D. Winans =

American poet

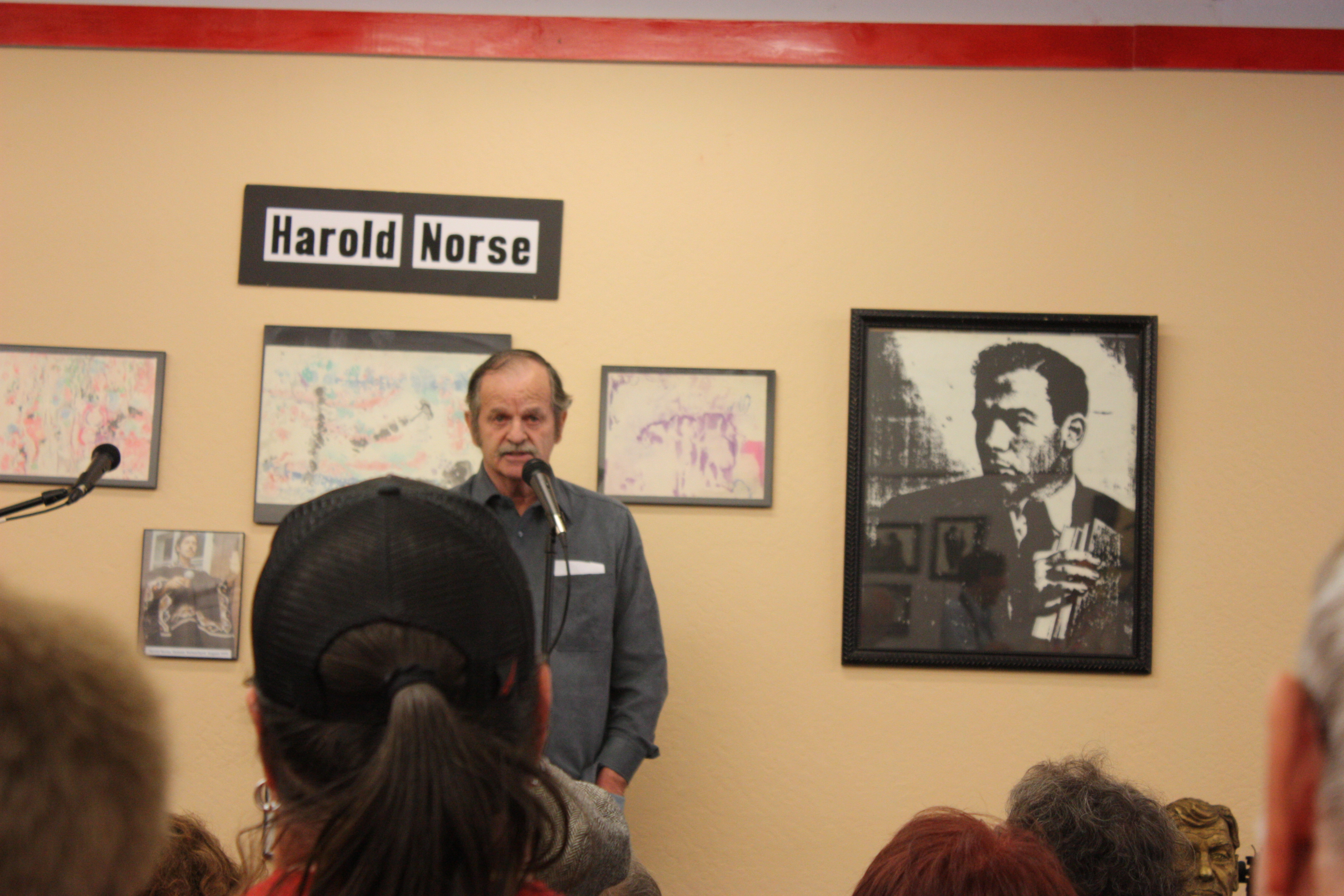
A. D. Winans in 2009 at Harold Norse Memorial Reading

Allan Davis Winans (born January 12, 1936, in San Francisco, California), known as A. D. Winans, is an American poet, essayist, short story writer and publisher.

== Early life ==
He returned to San Francisco from Panama in 1958, after serving three years in the military. In 1962, he graduated from San Francisco State College.

In North Beach he became friends with Beat poets such as Bob Kaufman and Jack Micheline.

== Career ==
=== Second Coming ===
He was the founder of Second Coming Press, a small press based in San Francisco that published books, poetry broadsides, a magazine, and anthologies. He edited Second Coming Magazine for seventeen years from 1972 to 1989. Winans became friends with Charles Bukowski, whose work he published. He also published Linda King, Jack Micheline, Bob Kaufman, Lawrence Ferlinghetti, Allen Ginsberg, Philip Levine, Josephine Miles, David Meltzer, and Charles Plymell.

Seminal books include:

- North Beach Poems (Second Coming Press), 1977
- Drowning Like Li Po in a River of Red Wine: Selected Poems 1970–2010 (Bottle of Smoke Press)
- San Francisco Poems (Little Red Tree Publishing), 2017.

In 2002, he published his memoir, Holy Grail: Charles Bukowski & The Second Coming Revolution.

== Other work ==
Winans had poetry, book reviews, and short stories published in over 1,500 magazines and anthologies. He wrote 68 books of poetry and two books of prose.

A song poem of his was performed at Alice Tully Hall, New York City. In 2012 his song poem was included in Song Cycles (a CD by various American composers) issued by the University of Lafayette along with song poems by Oscar Wilde, Ezra Pound, Langston Hughes, Kenneth Koch and others.

His essay on the late poet Bob Kaufman was published in American Poetry Review and republished by The Writers Research Group. The article appeared along with a poem for Kaufman in a booklet produced by the Los Angeles Afro-American Museum.

His book Cityscapes: A Quilt of Poetry was published by Cold River Press, Grass Valley, CA. Other books include Quiet Lightning, Neighborhood Hero (San Francisco), and Language of the Birds (Artistic History Plaque/North Beach).

Winans worked and retired from the U.S. Department of Education (Office of Civil Rights) as an Equal Opportunity Specialist investigating discrimination complaints from 1990–1995. He was chosen under the Federal Comprehensive Employment Training Act for a position with the San Francisco Art Commission, where he worked as a poet and editor from 1975–1980. In 1976, Winans teamed with poet Paul Fericano to teach poetry to junior high school students. In 1980, he produced the Second Coming Poets and Music Festival honoring poet Josephine Miles, blues legend John Lee Hooker, and poet and community activist Roberto Vargas.

Winans was an active participant in the Folsom Prison Writer's Workshop using Second Coming to publish several prison poets.

Winans appeared in the documentary film, 'When I Die I Won't Stay Dead on the life of poet Bob Kaufman, screened at the 2016 San Francisco International Film Festival.

He performed at venues including the Keystone Jazz Club, the Top of the Mark (Mark Hopkins Hotel), the Beat Museum, the Santa Cruz Poetry Festival, City Lights, and as the feature poet at the 2012 UC Davis Jazz and Beat Festival.

== Recognition ==
Winans was included in Contemporary Authors Autobiography Series (Gale Research) and Contemporary American Authors (Gale Research). His awards include:

- PEN National Josephine Miles Award for excellence in literature (2006)
- PEN Oakland Lifetime Achievement Award (2009)
- Kathy Acker Award (The New York Acker Award) in poetry and publishing (2015).
- Pig Iron Press Kenneth Patchen Award
- San Francisco Arts and Letters Foundation Award for outstanding achievement and contributions to the Literary Arts.
