= Ruth weiss (beat poet) =

German-born Austrian-American poet, playwright, performer and artist (1928–2020)

ruth weiss
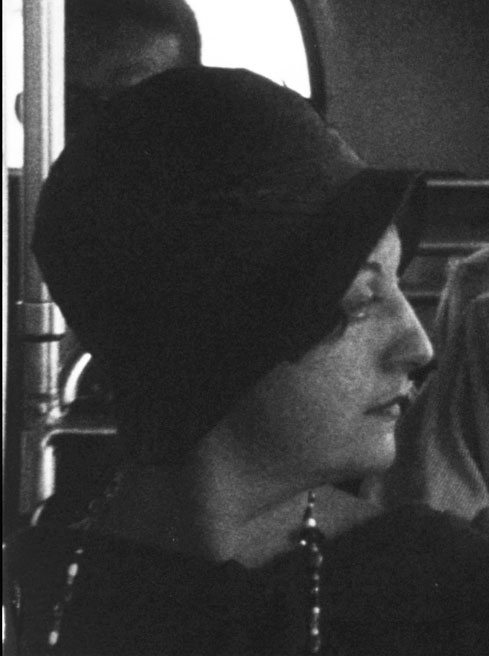
- ruth weiss in The Brink (1961)
- Born: June 24, 1928; Berlin, Germany
- Died: July 31, 2020 (aged 92); Albion, California, U.S.
- Citizenship: Austria; United States
- Occupations: Poet; performer; artist; filmmaker; activist

ruth weiss (June 24, 1928 – July 31, 2020), born Ruth Elisabeth Weisz, was an Austrian and American poet, performer, playwright, and artist. Born in Germany, but holding Austrian citizenship, weiss made her home and career in the United States. She was considered to be a member of the Beat Generation, a label she, in later years, embraced.

== Biography ==
=== Early life ===
Weiss came from a climate of political turmoil. Born to a Jewish family in the tumultuous years of the rise of Nazism, her early childhood was spent fleeing her home with her parents. Their bid for survival took them from their native Berlin to Vienna and eventually to the Netherlands, where she and her parents left for the United States. In 1939, they arrived in New York City and, from there, moved on to Chicago. She excelled academically at school in Chicago, graduating in the top 1% of her class. However, in 1946 the family moved back to Germany, this time not as German citizens but as American citizens, as her parents worked for the Army of Occupation. She went on to school in Switzerland and spent much time hitchhiking and writing - two skills that would prove pivotal to her future in the American Bohemian Beat scene. In 1948, weiss and her parents moved back to the United States, resettling in Chicago.

=== Early career 1940s–1950s ===
Weiss left home in 1949, at first staying in Chicago where she moved into the Art Circle - a housing community for artists. It was in this community that she began experimenting with poetry and jazz. In 1950, she left Chicago and hitchhiked to Greenwich Village in New York City, then later in 1950 moved to the Old French Quarter in New Orleans. In 1952 she decided to move to San Francisco, where she began jamming and reading poetry with street musicians. In 1956, her friends Jack Minger, Sonny Nelson and Wil Carlson, opened a club called The Cellar, in which she would hold poetry and jazz sessions every Wednesday night. Eventually, weiss felt that she needed a break from city life and took off for California's Big Sur, a place made famous as a Beat center due to Jack Kerouac's novel of the same name. In Breaking the Rule of Cool: Interviewing and Reading Women Beat Writers, weiss details the events at The Cellar following her departure. In regards to the poetry-jazz sessions, she tells her interviewer, "...other well-known poets, whose names I'm not going to mention because everyone knows them, ended up doing the same thing. Only they were very smart. They recorded them and got records out of them. So nobody knows that I did this, innovate jazz and poetry in San Francisco in 1956 at The Cellar." During this period in her life, she also began publishing proliferously in the magazine Beatitude, one of the first magazines for Beat writers.

In 1952, weiss and Jack Kerouac had, in her words, a "fantastic connection on multiple levels." It was two years after Kerouac had published his first novel, The Town and the City, though weiss did not yet know that he had written and published a book. Instead, weiss and Kerouac engaged in a "haiku dialogue," spending hours over a bottle of wine writing haiku back and forth to one another. Occasionally Neal Cassady would drop in and the three of them would drive off, adventuring outwards in California at dangerous speeds up dangerous hills, thriving on the excitement of the ride and one another's presence.

In 1957, weiss started a "salon kind of situation" in her apartment, creating a gathering space for poets and writers to read and discuss their works. It was also in that year that she married her first husband, Mel Weitsman, who later became a Zen priest. Two years later in 1959, weiss published her poetry collection Gallery of Women, paying homage to the female poets whom she most admired by painting their portraits through her jazz-inspired poetry.

=== 1960s–1970s ===
In 1961, weiss finished her narrative poem "The Brink." Upon reviewing her poem, the painter Paul Beattie asked if weiss could turn it into a film script, a request which she willingly obliged. By 1961, weiss had finished her creation and filming of The Brink, incorporating "found objects" into her style and philosophy towards the film.

However, Desert Journal is the work that weiss herself described as her masterpiece and her most significant work. The piece is an exploration of a mind in a desert. The poem's subject spends 40 days and nights in a desert and each day of the desert is limited to a poem of five pages, each day being its own poem within the greater whole. Every day, the gender-warping subject of the poem has a new area of exploration and revelation, and the poem brings the reader through the highs and lows, the turmoil and peace, that the disembodied protagonist transverses. She began writing this poem in 1961 and spent seven years on it, not completing it until 1968. It was published in 1977. She described this poem, like the bulk of her work, as a performance piece, a piece whose meaning she can fully express only through enacting it.

She asserted that, during the 1960s, she began spelling her name solely in lower case as a symbolic protest against "law and order", since in her birthplace of Germany all nouns are spelled capitalized.

In 1967, weiss met the artist Paul Blake (1945-2014), who became her longtime companion and collaborator.

=== Later career 1980s–2020s ===
In 1990, weiss won the Bay Area poetry slam and consequently released recordings of her poetry performance, entitled Poetry & Allthatjazz.

In 1996, weiss' film The Brink was screened at the Whitney Museum. In the same year she and Lawrence Ferlinghetti were invited to attend a poetry festival in Prague. On this occasion she visited Vienna for the first time since 1946 and started to return on a frequent basis, which resulted in a growing popularity in the German-speaking world. In the last two decades of her life she published a number of poetry collections with German and Austrian publishers, taught at the Vienna Poetry School along with Anne Waldman and Nick Cave, and was awarded the Medal of Honor of the City of Vienna in 2006.

She has published many poems and anthologies in recent years, including Full Circle/Ein Kreis vollendet sich (2002), a reflection on her escape from Nazi Germany. Her work also had a three-month exhibition at the San Francisco Public Library.

She continued to perform live in North Beach and at many jazz and poetry festivals, including appearances at the San Francisco Beat Festival in 2016.

An award winning feature documentary about her life entitled ruth weiss: One More Step West Is the Sea, directed by Thomas Antonic and produced by Robert von Dassanowsky, premiered at the Diagonale film festival in 2021 and won the New York Independent Cinema Awards in the category "Best International Documentary Feature" in the same year. The film has been screened at numerous international film festivals, among them the Hof International Film Festival. It had its official theater premiere at the Roxie Theater in San Francisco. Another award winning feature documentary has been made about her life story called "ruth weiss, the beat goddess" directed by Melody C. Miller and produced by Elisabeth P. Montgomery. The film premiered at the Asolo Art Film Festival in Italy and won Best Documentary at the Peekskill Film Festival in New York.

ruth weiss was awarded the 2020 Maverick Spirit Award from the Cinequest Film Festival. This prestigious award is given to influential individuals who embody the independent and innovative mindset and has previously been awarded to Werner Herzog, Harrison Ford, Jackie Chan, and many more.

On July 31, 2020, weiss died at her home in Albion, California.

== Influences ==
Weiss credits Gertrude Stein, Virginia Woolf, the French New Wave and Djuna Barnes, among many others, as her most significant influences.

However, as she primarily considered herself a "jazz poet," she also credited jazz and bebop as the art most influential upon her own. In Breaking the Rules of Cool, weiss recounts a night in 1949 while she was living in the Art Circle of Chicago. On this night, there was a crowd of people in her building having a jazz jam session downstairs while weiss was preoccupied writing in her room. However, a friend of hers paid a visit, read her work and recommended that she bring it downstairs and read it to the musicians. The musicians, far from halting their music to listen, listened by continuing to jam as she read, and likewise, weiss listened to and communicated with their jazz by incorporating it into her poem. It is that experience that she credited as the beginning of her "whole thing with jazz and poetry."

== Style ==
The philosophy behind her work incorporates several interlinking components: being a "street poet," being a "jazz poet," the idea of non-linearity and fragmentation, the idea of discipline and the bare "bones" of language.

Her focus upon succinctness and discipline is epitomized in her predilection for haiku. She relished the haiku for the discipline it imposes upon the writer and the way it forces the "fat" to be cut away from the poem, revealing the most essential elements of language.

Similarly, this focus upon "cutting out the fat" lies at the heart of her artistic journey with Desert Journal. One person who reviewed Desert Journal described weiss as "master of the eraser." It is this ability to "erase" that characterizes weiss's work and that she herself found most pivotal to her style. She described it as epitomizing the process that she went through with all her work: the idea of non-linearity, of beginning with a core and allowing the essential fragments that develop to become the substance of the piece.

She also cited being inspired by the "oral tradition." She explained this in light of her close friendship and artistic connection with the famed poet Madeline Gleason. Her poetry, she said, is a performance, it is something communicated by the voice and body.

Finally, weiss declared that while she is not a "street poet" in the traditional sense, her work resonates most in "street" settings or other unexpected places. She found that her work was often most acclaimed, connected with and called for in places ranging from streets to pizza places and gay bars, drawing a large, diverse crowd.

== The ruth weiss Foundation ==
In 2020, The ruth weiss Foundation was created to celebrate the life and legacy of the renowned poet and author. The Foundation's mission is to create opportunities to help aspiring and under-served poets and artists through an annual grant/scholarship.

== Research Project and Complete Works Critical Edition ==
Since 2025, Thomas Antonic is conducting a research project on ruth weiss at the Danube University in Krems, Austria, the aim of which is to publish a multi-volume critical edition of the poet’s complete works.

== Bibliography ==
=== Books ===
- Steps (1958)
- Gallery of Women (1959)
- South Pacific (1959)
- Blue in Green (1960)
- Light and Other Poems (1976)
- Desert Journal (1977, new edition 2012 by Trembling Pillow Press)
- Single Out (1978)
- 13 Haiku (1986)
- For These Women of the Beat (1997)
- A New View of Matter / Nový pohled na věc (1999)
- Full Circle / Ein Kreis vollendet sich (2002)
- Africa (2003)
- White is All Colors / Weiß ist alle Farben (2004)
- No Dancing Aloud / Lautes Tanzen nicht erlaubt (2006)
- Can't Stop the Beat: The Life and Words of a Beat Poet (2011)
- A Fool's Journey / Die Reise des Narren (2012)
- A Parallel Planet of People and Places (2012)
- Einen Schritt weiter im Westen ist die See [One More Step West is the Sea] (2012)
- The Snake Sez Yesssss / Die Schlange sagt Jetzzzzzt (2013)
- Death Becomes Light Is the Bird of Our Love (2021)

=== Contributions to anthologies (selection) ===
- Beatitude Anthology (1960)
- Peace & Pieces. An Anthology of Contemporary American Poetry (1973)
- This is Women's Work. An Anthology of Prose and Poetry (1974)
- Contemporary Fiction: Today's Outstanding Writers (1976)
- 19+1: An Anthology of San Francisco Poetry (1978)
- Second Coming Anthology (1984)
- A Different Beat: Writings by Women of the Beat Generation (1997)
- The Outlaw Bible of American Poetry (1999)
- Beat Attitude: Antología de mujeres poetas de la generación beat (2015)
- Beat Attitude: Femmes poètes de la Beat Generation (2018)
- Austrian Beat (2018)

== Filmography ==
=== Acting ===
- The Brink (1961)
- The Liberation of the Mannique Mechanique (1967), dir. Steven Arnold
- Messages, Messages (1968), dir. Steven Arnold
- Various Incantations of a Tibetan Seamstress (1969), dir. Steven Arnold
- Luminous Procuress (1971), dir. Steven Arnold
- Las Cuevas de Albion (2001)
- Ibéria (2007), dir. Eddy Falconer

=== Directing ===
- The Brink (1961)

=== Documentaries ===
- Surprise Voyage (2001), dir. Paul Blake
- Breaking the Rules: Across American Counterculture (2006), dir. Marco Müller
- ruth weiss Meets Her Prometheus (2007), dir. Frederick Baker
- San Francisco's Wild History Groove: Underground Artists and Poets from the California Beat Era (2011), dir. Mary Kerr
- Steven Arnold: Heavenly Bodies (2019), dir. Vishnu Dass
- ruth weiss, the beat goddess (2019), dir. Melody C. Miller
- ruth weiss: One More Step West Is the Sea (2021), dir. Thomas Antonic
