= Len Fulton =

American publisher (1934–2011)

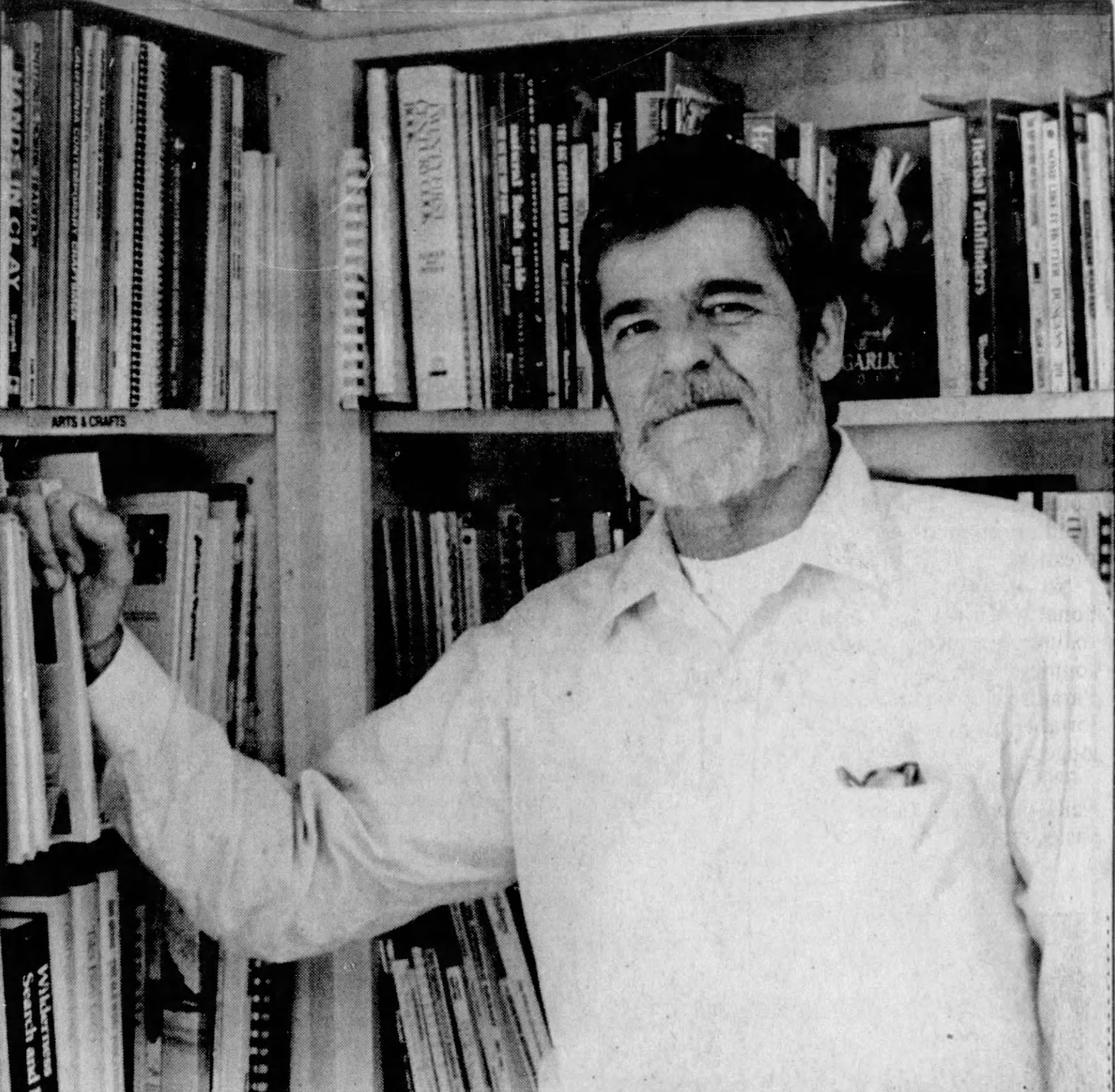
Fulton in 1986

Leonard V. Fulton (May 15, 1934 – July 24, 2011) was an author, publisher, and local politician in California. He was born May 15, 1934 in Lowell, Massachusetts.

He owned Dustbooks, a publishing business that produced the Small Press Review annually. He had an important role in promoting small publishers and authors producing work outside major publishing channels.

He was interviewed in 2003.

He died of lung cancer on July 24, 2011.

== Writing and editing ==
- Fulton, Len. 1971. Anima Rising: Little Magazines in the Sixties. American Libraries, 2, 1, 25-47, Jan '71
- Fulton, Len. 1974. The Grassman: A Novel. Berkeley, California: Thorp Springs Press.
- Fulton, Len. 1975. Dark Other Adam Dreaming. Paradise, CA: Dustbooks.
- International Directory of Little Magazines and Small Presses (1974)
- Fulton, Len, and Ellen Ferber. 1975. American Odyssey : A Bookselling Travelogue. Paradise, CA: Dustbooks.
- Fulton, Len, ed. 1977. Small Press Record of Books in Print. 6th ed. Paradise, Calif.: Dustbooks.
- Fulton, Len, and Ellen Ferber. 1985. Directory of Poetry Publishers 1985/86. 1st ed. Paradise, CA: Dustbooks.
- Fulton, Len, ed. 2009. The International Directory of Little Magazines & Small Presses, 2009-2010. 45th ed. Paradise, CA: Dustbooks.
