= Steve Richmond (poet) =

American poet (1941–2009)

Steve Richmond (1941 − October 21, 2009) was an American poet from Southern California whose notoriety comes primarily from his association with the mid-career of poet Charles Bukowski in the 1960s. He is also associated with the "Meat School" of American poetry, known for a direct, tough and masculine style of writing. Other "Meat School" poets were Bukowski and William Wantling.

Bukowski helped mentor Richmond early in his career.

== Early life ==
The son of a wealthy family with extensive holdings in rental properties in the beach communities of Southern California, Richmond attended U.C.L.A., where he was pledged to the Phi Lambda Phi fraternity. After graduating, he earned a juris doctor degree from U.C.L.A. Law School but failed to pass the bar. He wound up as a rent collector for the family's properties, many of which were located in Santa Monica.

Richmond would live in Santa Monica for most of his life, including 40 years in a beach cottage he first rented from his grandmother for $40 a month and then inherited. So close was his tie to the city, that one of his collections would be entitled Santa Monica Poems.

== Meat Poet ==
Richmond began publishing poetry in 1964, when Wormwood Review accepted eight of his poems. Many of his books of poetry were self-published as he was a difficult and contentious person to deal with, as he was a serious user of narcotics. Addicted to heroin for 40 years, he finally kicked the habit three years before his death. One of his proposed prose books was about his relationship with Jim Morrison (Richmond's style influenced the poetry written by the front man of The Doors), but the publisher backed out.

He developed a unique style based on the rhythms of gagaku (雅楽, literally "elegant music"), the Shinto-influenced classical music performed at the Japanese imperial court. Richmond heard gagaku music on records at U.C.L.A.'s Department of Ethnomusicology. In a 2009 interview with writer Ben Pleasants, Richmond claimed he had written an estimated 8,000-9,000 gagaku poems.

Richmond eventually inherited $2 million, which he lived on, eventually spending all the money after a dozen years in which he nursed his heroin addiction. He eventually wound up in Santa Monica's homeless shelter, which combined with a hospital stay, helped him kick his habit.

== Published works ==
- Earth Rose (1966), Earth Rose 1
- Demon Notebook (1988) Water Row Books
- Aphrodite Rising (1990), Guerilla Poetics Books
- Hitler Painted Roses. Poems. 1963/1994. (1994), Earth Books and Sun Dog Press
- Spinning Off Bukowski (1996), Sun Dog Press
- Red Work, Black Widow (1974), Duck Down Press
