= Fuck You (magazine) =

Defunct American literary magazine

- Fuck You/ A Magazine of the Arts No. 1 (February 1962) First edition, side-stapled in printed and illustrated cover, 8.5″ x 11″, 26 pages, mimeograph printed. Cover art and illustrations by Ed Sanders
- Editor: Ed Sanders
- Categories: Avant-garde
- Publisher: Ed Sanders
- First issue: February/April 1962
- Final issue Number: 1965; 13
- Country: United States
- Language: English

Fuck You/ A Magazine of the Arts was a literary magazine founded in 1962 by the poet Ed Sanders on the Lower East Side of New York City. Sanders later co-founded the musical group the Fugs. Sanders produced thirteen issues of Fuck You/ A Magazine of the Arts from 1962 to 1965.

The credo for the magazine, originated by Sanders, was I'll print anything. Its first issue contained the following dedication: "Dedicated to Pacifism, Unilateral Disarmament, National Defense thru Nonviolent Resistence [sic], Multilateral Indiscriminate Apertural Conjugation, Anarchism, World Federalism, Civil Disobedience, Obstructers & Submarine Boarders, and All Those Groped by J. Edgar Hoover in the Silent Halls of Congress."

Fuck You/ A Magazine of the Arts was produced on a mimeograph and printed on multi-colored construction paper.

== Legacy ==
Fuck You/ A Magazine of the Arts was a core publication in the Mimeo Revolution. It was dedicated to free expression, and especially defying the taboos around sex and drugs, advocating free love promiscuity and the use of psychedelics long before those were picked up by the more widespread countercultural movements of the late Sixties. Ed Sanders and his collaborators served as a bridge between the Beat Generation of the Fifties and the later Hippie counterculture of the mid Sixties.

== List of issues ==
1. Number 1 (Feb/April 1962)
2. Number 2 (May 1962)
3. Number 3 (June 1962)
4. Number 4 (August 1962)
5. Number 5, Volume 1 (Dec 1962)
6. Number 5, Volume 2 (Dec 1962)
7. Number 5, Volume 3 (May 1963)
8. Number 5, Volume 4 (??? 1963)
9. Number 5, Volume 5 (Dec 1963)
10. Number 5, Volume 6 (April/May 1964)
11. Number 5, Volume 7 (Sept 1964)
12. Number 5, Volume 8 (1965)—Mad Motherfucker Issue (Andy Warhol cover)
13. Number 5, Volume 9 (June 1965)

== Participants ==
Issues included works by:

- Antonin Artaud
- W. H. Auden
- Julian Beck
- Ted Berrigan
- Joe Brainard
- William S. Burroughs
- Gregory Corso
- Robert Creeley
- Diane DiPrima
- Allen Ginsberg
- Herbert Huncke
- Leroi Jones
- Tuli Kupferberg
- Norman Mailer
- Michael McClure
- Charles Olson
- Frank O'Hara
- Peter Orlovsky
- Gary Snyder
- Andy Warhol
- Philip Whalen
