= Douglas Blazek =

Polish-American poet and editor (born 1941)

Douglas Blazek (born December 31, 1941) is a Polish-American poet and editor who published the literary chapbook Ole and was proprietor of the Open Skull Press.

Blazek is one of the founders of the Mimeo Revolution, a literary movement that sprang up concurrently with The Beats. He was instrumental in bringing non-establishment poets and artists such as Charles Bukowski, Robert Crumb and D. A. Levy into the limelight by publishing their work. He published his first book of poetry under the pseudonym (and double entendre) Peter Wellinher.

As described in the introduction to James DenBoer's A Bibliography of the Published Works of Douglas Blazek: 1961-2001 (Glass Eye Books, 2003), Blazek is noteworthy for his prolific early period (1964-1978), followed by an extended hiatus. Between 1978 and 2009, Blazek published only one book, but this was also a time of intense creativity, as the poet focused on rewriting all his previously published work. The first book-length results of this labor, Aperture Mirror and Gutting Cats in Search of Fiddles, were published in 2012 by Edition Muta with more titles published in the years following.

== Bibliography ==
- We Can Be Gentle and Undeceived Both (as Peter Wellinher) (Andabata Press, 1964)
- Long Dongs (with Joe Nickell & Steve Richmond) (7 Flowers Press, 1966)
- Life in a Common Gun: An Informal Book of Communications (Quixote, 1968)
- All Gods Must Learn to Kill (Analecta Press, 1968)
- Forever Worship the Second Coming (editor) (San Francisco, CA: Black Rabbit Press, 1968)
- Broken Knuckle Poems (San Francisco, CA: Black Rabbit Press, 1969)
- Battlefield Syrup (San Francisco, CA: Lone Ranger Biology Press, 1969)
- I Advance With a Loaded Rose (Twowindows Press, 1969)
- Fuck Off Unless You Take Off That Mask (Gunrunner Press, 1969)
- Climbing Blind (Second Aeon Publications, 1970)
- Flux & Reflux: Journeys in a Magical Fluid (Oyez, 1970)
- Skull Juices (Twowindows Press, 1970)
- Why Man Goes To The Moon (Morgan Press, 1970)
- Zany Typhoons (Open Skull Press, Sacramento, CA, 1970)
- This Is What You Wanted, Isn't It?: Poems by Douglas Blazek (pamphlet) (Watertown, MA: AugTwoFive, 1970).
- Inner Marathons (chapbook) (Killaly Press, 1973)
- A Bukowski Sampler, editor (Druid Press, 1973)
- I Am a Weapon (chapbook) (Ox Head Press, 1975)
- Lethal Paper (chapbook) (The Stone Press, 1975)
- Exercises in Memorizing Myself (Twowindows Press, 1976)
- Edible Fire (Morgan Press, 1978)
- We Sleep as the Dream Weaves Outside Our Minds (Alantansi Press, 1994)
- A Bibliography of the Published Works of Douglas Blazek: 1961-2001 (Glass Eye Books, 2003)
- News of a Useless Thing (Prismatic Navigator Press, 2009)
- The Pied Piper of Advanced Perception (48th Street Press, Philadelphia, PA, 2010)
- The Song That Ends Ends Our Singing (48th Street Press, Philadelphia, PA, 2012)
- Aperture Mirror (Edition Muta, Easthampton, MA, 2012)
- Gutting Cats in Search of Fiddles (Edition Muta, Easthampton, MA, 2012)
- The Blindfold Alphabet (Edition Muta, Easthampton, MA, 2014)
- Ventriloquy of Light (Edition Muta, Easthampton, MA, 2014)
- Foolish Visions (Edition Muta, Easthampton, MA, 2015)
- Vanished Pursuit into a Remembered Future (Edition Muta, Easthampton, MA, 2015)
- After Walking To And Fro And Up And Down In It (Edition Muta, Easthampton, MA, 2017)
- A Long Rope Into The Void (Edition Muta, Easthampton, MA, 2017)
- The Open Mirror Like A Window (collage catalog) (Prismatic Navigator Press, 2019)
