= Gerald Locklin =

American poet (1941–2021)

- Born: February 17, 1941; Rochester, New York, U.S.
- Died: January 17, 2021 (aged 79); Irvine, California, U.S.
- Writing career
- Genre: poetry

Gerald Locklin (February 17, 1941 – January 17, 2021) was an American poet. He was a professor of English at California State University, Long Beach and the poetry editor of Chiron Review.

== Biography ==
Locklin was born and raised in Rochester, New York. He received a bachelor's degree from St. John Fisher College in 1961, an M.A. from the University of Arizona in 1963 and a Ph.D. from the institution in 1964.

He taught at Long Beach State from 1965 to 2007 and was also a part-time lecturer in the University of Southern California's Master of Professional Writing Program. From 1964 to 1965, he was an instructor at California State University, Los Angeles.

Locklin died from COVID-19 during the COVID-19 pandemic in California, exactly one month before his 80th birthday.

== Friendship with Charles Bukowski ==
He was a friend of Charles Bukowski, whom he first met in 1970, when he arranged for Bukowski to give a reading at CSU, Long Beach. Whereas Bukowski was an avatar of the "Meat School" of poetry that flourished in the 1960s and '70s, Locklin was considered a "Stand-Up" poet. According to Locklin, Charles Harper Webb defined "Stand-Up" poets as having "the qualities of directness, humor, pathos, performability, accessibility, [and] manliness...."

Despite being 20 years Bukowski's junior, they got along, even with the senior poet's aversion to "academics".

I think we got along because we shared many attitudes—towards women, towards writing, towards drinking, towards sports, towards people we liked or disliked—in spite of my being an "academic", and the 20 years difference in our ages, and the differences in our upbringings, we were not all that different at the core. And I liked his work a lot and did a lot to promote it.

Locklin wrote a memoir of that friendship, Charles Bukowski: A Sure Bet, that was published in 1995.

== Work ==
Locklin's first poem was published in Wormwood Review, which also published Bukowski. His first chapbook, Sunset Beach, was published in 1967. Locklin has published over 3,000 poems, works of fiction, reviews and articles that have appeared in numerous periodicals. He has published in excess of 125 books, chapbooks, and poetry broadsides.
