= Pragativadi =

Indian Newspaper

- Type: Daily newspaper
- Format: Broadsheet
- Founder: Pradyumna Bal
- Founded: 1973
- Political alignment: Independent
- Language: Odia
- Headquarters: Bhubaneswar, India
- Website: pragativadi.com

Pragativadi is an Indian Odia language daily newspaper published from Bhubaneswar. This is one of the most circulated news dailies in Odisha. Founded in the year 1973 by Pradyumna Bal, currently it is being edited by Birupakshya Tripathy. The newspaper also has a news website and an online version of the printed newspapers freely available to internet users.

it publish 6 edition Everyday.
