= Neeli Cherkovski =

American poet and memoirist (1945–2024)

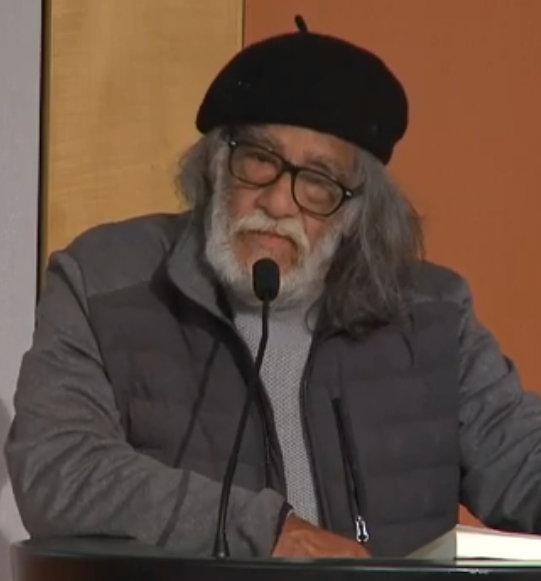
- Speaking at the San Francisco Public Library in 2022
- Born: Nelson Innis Cherry; July 1, 1945; Santa Monica, California, U.S.
- Died: March 19, 2024 (aged 78); San Francisco, California, U.S.
- Education: California State University, Los Angeles
- Occupations: Writer, poet
- Partner: Jesus Guinto Cabrera

Neeli Cherkovski (born Nelson Innis Cherry; July 1, 1945 – March 19, 2024) was an American poet and memoirist, who resided from 1975 onwards in San Francisco.

== Biography ==
Born Nelson Innis Cherry to a Jewish family in Santa Monica, California, on July 1, 1945, Cherkovski grew up in San Bernardino, California. The surname Cherkovski was his family's original name, which his paternal grandfather changed to Cherry after immigrating to the United States.

Cherkovski was educated at California State University, Los Angeles, and briefly attended Hebrew Union College. In the 1970s, he was a political consultant in the Riverside area, who came to San Francisco to work on the staff of then-State Senator George Moscone. Cherkovski wrote biographies of Lawrence Ferlinghetti, and Charles Bukowski, with whom he co-edited the Los Angeles magazine Laugh Literary and Man the Humping Guns. Cherkovski produced the first San Francisco Poetry Festival, and in the early 1990s helped to found Café Arts Month, a yearly event celebrating San Francisco's café culture.

Poetry critic Gerald Nicosia said of Cherkovski: "...in the end, what stamps Cherkovski’s poetry as unique is its unbounded lyricism, a lyrical gift easily greater than that of any other poet of his generation."

Cherkovski was the author of Whitman's Wild Children, a collection of essays about twelve poets he had known: Michael McClure, Bukowski, John Wieners, James Broughton, Philip Lamantia, Bob Kaufman, Allen Ginsberg, William Everson, Gregory Corso, Harold Norse, Jack Micheline, and Ferlinghetti. This book combines biography, personal stories, and poetry analyses.

Cherkovski was a writer-in-residence at the New College of California in San Francisco. He taught literature and philosophy there until the school closed in 2008. His body of poetry includes Animal, Elegy for Bob Kaufman and Leaning Against Time, for which he was awarded the 15th Annual PEN Oakland/Josephine Miles Literary Award in 2005. In 2017, he was awarded the Jack Mueller Poetry Prize by Lithic Press. Cherkovski's papers are housed at the Bancroft Library, University of California, Berkeley. He continued to write poems up until the end of his life.

Cherkovski died from a heart attack at a hospital in San Francisco on March 19, 2024, at the age of 78. At the time of his death, he was in a relationship with Jesus Guinto Cabrera.

== Bibliography ==
- Don't Make a Move (Tecumseh Press, 1974)
- The Waters Reborn (Red Hill Press, 1975)
- Public Notice (Beatitude, 1975)
- Ferlinghetti, a biography (DoubleDay, 1979)
- Love Proof (Green Light Press, 1980)
- Juggler Within (Harwood Alley Monographs, 1983)
- Clear Wind (Avant Books, 1984)
- Whitman's Wild Children (Lapis Press, 1989)
- Hank: The Life of Charles Bukowski (Random House, 1991)
- Animal (Pantograph Press, 1996)
- Elegy for Bob Kaufman (Sun Dog Press, 1996)
- Leaning Against Time (R.L. Crow Publications, 2004)
- Naming the Nameless (Sore Dove Press, 2004)
- From the Canyon Outward (R.L. Crow Publications, 2009)]
- From the Middle Woods (New Native Press, 2011)
- Manila Poems (Bottle of Smoke Press, 2013)
- Elegy for My Beat Generation (Lithic Press, 2018)
- In the Odes (Magra Books, 2018)
- Coolidge & Cherkovski: In Conversation (Lithic Press, 2020)
- Cherkovski, Neeli (May 2024). Selected Poems 1959-2022. Lithic Press. ISBN 978-1-946583-31-4.
