= Robert Peters (writer) =

American poet, critic, scholar, playwright, editor and actor

- Robert Peters in 2004
- Born: Robert Louis Peters; October 20, 1924; Eagle River, Wisconsin
- Died: June 13, 2014 (aged 89); Irvine, California
- Occupations: Poet; memoirist; Victorian scholar; critic; playwright; professor

Robert Louis Peters (October 20, 1924 – June 13, 2014) was an American poet, critic, scholar, playwright, editor, and actor. He held a PhD in Victorian literature. Born in an impoverished rural area of northern Wisconsin in 1924, his poetry career began in 1967 when his young son Richard died unexpectedly of spinal meningitis. The book commemorating this loss, Songs for a Son, was selected by poet Denise Levertov to be published by W. W. Norton in 1967. Songs for a Son began a flood of poetry.

== Academic beginnings ==
After army service during World War II, he enrolled at the University of Wisconsin, majoring in English. He received his BA in 1948, his MA in 1949 and his doctorate in 1952. His teaching career took him to Wayne State University, Boston University, Ohio Wesleyan University, the University of Idaho, the University of California, Riverside, and then the University of California, Irvine, where he first taught in 1967. His field of study was Victorian literature. In addition to publishing articles and monographs, he edited, with Herbert Schueller, the letters of John Addington Symonds. Peters received a Fulbright Fellowship to Cambridge, England, in the 1960s to work on Symonds's letters. In 1965, he published The Crowns of Apollo, a scholarly study on Algernon Charles Swinburne. After Peters's Songs for a Son was published, he devoted more time to the writing and study of contemporary poetry. Fellow poets Charles Wright and James McMichael and novelist Oakley Hall taught poetry at UC Irvine during this time and shared directorship of the university's Master of Fine Arts program.

== Poet and critic ==
Peters was a prolific poet, having published some 30 books of poems, and he was an important critic of contemporary American poetry. In his controversial books of criticism—The Great American Poetry Bake-Off series, Peters Black and Blue Guides to Current Literary Magazines and Hunting the Snark: A Compendium of New Literary Terminology—he assessed more than 400 contemporary poets and critics. He also wrote poetry reviews for the Los Angeles Times.

His Where the Bee Sucks: Workers, Drones & Queens of Contemporary American Poetry includes 35 essays on such major figures as Robert Bly, Charles Bukowski, Allen Ginsberg, John Ashbery, Diane Wakoski, Robert Creeley, Robert Duncan, Tess Gallagher and W. S. Merwin, as well as commentaries on the work of lesser-known poets.

Billy Collins, a former student of Peters' and now a poet in his own right, once described Peters' poetry: "modifies poetic language and breaks new artistic ground. By combining playful rhymes with painfully serious matter, he has returned new tonal possibilities to poetry. By fully exploiting the metaphor of the body, ... he has provided a fresh code for the expression of feeling".

Robert Bly, poet and author of Iron John, wrote about Peters's American Poetry Bakeoff book of criticism as "not maternal ... insights are set down simply, unornamented, as if intended to glance off, and yet I think they are important, and belong to the center ... He deserves numerous readers, particularly among young poets dissatisfied with the celebrities who keep writing the same poem over and over again ... [His] essay on Robert Creeley is superb; the best essay on his work I know."

In the fall of 2001, the 40th volume of Peters's Familial Love and Other Misfortunes was published. Peters served as a contributing editor for The American Book Review, Contact II and Paintbrush.

=== Style of poetry ===
His poetry covers a wide range of themes and forms, from intensely personal volumes of private celebrations and losses—the death of a son, the break-up of a marriage, and his rural Wisconsin origins—to excursions into the psyches of a vast gallery of historical eccentrics, numbering among them, a Bavarian king, a Hungarian countess (and mass murderer) and a British romantic painter. The root of his interest in personae poetry goes back to his studies of Victorian poet Robert Browning. He adapted both King Ludwig II of Bavaria and Elizabeth Báthory, the Hungarian Countess, for theatrical presentation, performing them around the country. His Poems: Selected & New includes a rich sampling of work written over the past 30 years, while collecting in a single volume many of Peters's best poems.

Poet Diane Wakoski describes his poetry as follows: "The fascination with the dead, with the rotting, with pigs rooting into the earth, a poem about a primal scene in a root cellar, discovering sex and the underground, taboo, death-related experience—this is what all of Peters' poetry is about ... which gives it great originality and power."

=== Performances ===
His acting career developed after countless poetry readings. Peters wanted to reach a larger audience with his poetry by transforming his personae poetry into theatrical monologues replete with memorized scripts, lighting, settings and sound tracks. He performed at Barnsdall Art Park in Los Angeles, at Carpet Company Theatre in Los Angeles, Fine Art Theatre at UCI, Provincetown's Summer Theatre, St. Matthew's Church near Broadway, New York and many college campus venues. He took acting lessons from his colleague, Fine Arts Professor Robert Cohen, at University of California, Irvine. These performances are all well-documented in Peters's journals, video recordings, flyers, playbills, posters and scrapbooks, replete with reviews and photos, which are all housed and catalogued at UCSD Mandeville Special Collections Library.

== Memoirs ==
Peters wrote four memoirs of his days during the 1930s in the North Woods of Wisconsin. His last memoir was on the death of his third son, which took place in the 1950s. Thomas Keneally, author of Schindler's List, summarized Peters's second memoir, Nell's Story, by saying, "As a fascinating exercise in obscure lives retrieved, as a joint effort in painful and exultant memory, this rich memoir has the playful seriousness and inventive charm which characterizes the work of Robert Peters".

== Awards and honors ==
Peters judged competitions for fellowships and prizes for small presses and for the Poetry Society of America and PEN International. He enjoyed Guggenheim and National Endowment for the Arts fellowships, a Fulbright Scholarship, and won the Alice Fay di Castagnola Award of the Poetry Society of America.

== Legacy ==
Peters's papers from 1950 to 1990 are on deposit in the Kenneth Spencer Research Library at the University of Kansas. His working library of contemporary poetry, with related papers, is now in the Rare Book Collection at Bowling Green State University. His remaining archives have been obtained by the Geisel Library Special Collections at the University of California San Diego.

== Personal life ==
Shortly after his divorce from his wife Jean, Peters met poet Paul Trachtenberg and established a relationship lasting more than 36 years living in Huntington Beach, California

== Death ==
He died on June 13, 2014, in Huntington Beach, California, from natural causes at the age of 89.

== Works ==
=== Books of poetry ===
- Songs for a Son, W. W. Norton, 1967
- The Sow's Head and Other Poems, Wayne State University Press, 1968
- Connections: In the English Lake District, Anvil Press Chapbook Series, London 1972
- Red Midnight Moon, Empty Elevator Shaft Chapbook Series, 1973
- Holy Cow: Parable Poems, Red Hill Press, San Francisco, 1974
- Bronchial Tangle, Heart System, Granite Books, 1975
- Cool Zebras of Light, Christopher's Books, Santa Barbara, California, 1975
- The Gift to Be Simple: A Garland for Ann Lee, Liveright/ W.W. Norton, 1975
- The Poet as Ice Skater, Manroot Books, 1976
- Gauguin's Chair: Selected Poems 1967-1974, Crossing Press, 1977
- Hawthorne, Red Hill Press, San Francisco, 1977
- The Drowned Man to the Fish, New Rivers Press 1978
- Ikagnak: The North Wind, Kenmore Press, 1978
- Celebrities: In Memory of Margaret Dumont, Sombre Reptiles, 1981
- The Picnic in the Snow: Ludwig of Bavaria, New Rivers Press, 1982
- What John Dillinger Meant to Me, Sea Horse Press, 1983
- Love Poems For Robert Mitchum, Chiron Review Press, 1983
- Hawker, Unicorn Press, 1984
- Kane, Unicorn Press, 1985
- Shaker Light, Unicorn Press, 1986
- Ludwig of Bavaria: Poems and a Play, Revised edition, Cherry Valley Edition, 1986
- The Blood Countess: Poems and a Play, Cherry Valley Edition, 1987
- Haydon, Unicorn Press, 1988
- Breughel's Pig, Illuminati Press, Los Angeles, 1990
- Good Night, Paul, GLB Publishers, 1992
- Snapshots For a Serial Killer, GLB Publishers, 1992
- Robert Peters: Poems: Selected & New, 1967-1991, Asylum Arts, 1992
- Familial Love and Other Misfortunes, Red Hen Press, Los Angeles, 2002
- Makars' Dozens, Pearl Edition, Long Beach, California 2006

=== Criticism, scholarship, and other publications ===
- Victorians on Literature and Art, Appleton-Century-Crofts, 1961
- America: The Diary of a Visit, By Edmund Gosse, edited by Robert Peters Purdue University 1966
- The Crowns of Apollo: Swinburne's Principles of Literature and Art, Wayne State University
- The Letters of John Addington Symonds, Ed. with H.Schueller, 3 vols, Wayne State University Press, 1967–1969
- Pioneers of Modern Poetry, with George Hitchcock, Kayak Press, 1967
- Gabriel: A Poem by John Addington Symonds, Edited by Robert Peters & Timothy D'Arch Smith, London: Harrington 1974
- The Great American Poetry Bakee-Off I, II, III, IV Series, Scarecrow Press, Metuchen, New Jersey 1979, 1982, 1987, & 1991
- The Peters' Black and Blue Guide to Current Literary Journals, first and second series, Cherry Valley Editions, New York, 1983 and 1985
- The Peters' Black and Blue Guide to Current Literary Journals, third series, Dustbooks, 1987
- Hunting the Snark: American Poetry at Century End: Classifications and Commentary, Paragon House, New York 1989
- Letters to a Tutor: The Tennyson Family Letters to Henry Graham Dakyns, Scarecrow Press, 1989
- Where the Bee Sucks: Workers, Drones & Queens of Contemporary American Poetry, Asylum Arts, 1994
- SLIME The Secret Sex-Life of J. Edgar Hoover, Artist Eric Reynolds Eros Comix 1995
- Revised Edition of Hunting The Snark: American Poetry at Century End: Classifications and Commentary, Avisson Press, 1997
- Ludwig of Bavaria & Other Short Plays, Asylum Arts, 2001

=== Memoirs ===
- Crunching Gravel: A Wisconsin Boyhood in the Thirties, University of Wisconsin Press, 1993
- Nell: A Woman From Wisconsin, University of Wisconsin Press, 1995
- For You, Lili Marlene" A Memoir of WW II, University of Wisconsin Press, 1995
- Feather: A Child's Life and Death, University of Wisconsin Press, 1997

=== Interviews ===
- With Billy Collins, in Gauguin's Chair: Selected Poems, Crossing Press, 1977
- With William Matthews, "The Shaker Poems", in The Great American Poetry Bake-off: Second Series, Ibid., 141–150.
- Featured in the Writer's Autobiography Series, Vol. VIII, Gale Research Company, December 1989

=== Essays on Robert Peters ===
- Diane Wakoski, in American Poetry, Winter 1985, 71–78
- Billy Collins, "Literary Reputation and the Thrown Voice", in A Gift of Tongues: Critical Challenges in Contemporary American Poetry, eds. Marie Harris and Kathleen Augero, University of Georgia Press, 1987, 295–306.
- Charles Hood, "Robert Peters", for the Dictionary of Literary Biography.
