= Beatitude (magazine) =

Poetry magazine of the Beat Generation

Cover of Beatitude issue number 2 by Walt Gray

Beatitude was a poetry magazine of the Beat Generation that was published in San Francisco between 1959 and sometime in the 1970s. It was first conceived of by Allen Ginsberg, Bob Kaufman, and John Kelly (the publisher).

Beatitude was originally published in mimeograph at the Bread and Wine Mission on Grant Avenue in San Francisco's North Beach from 8.5" x 11" mimeographed sheets with an illustrated front cover on construction paper. It had no back cover and was stapled together. It originally sold for 20 or 30 cents an issue.

The magazine included work by its legendary Beatnick founders and by Jack Kerouac, Diane Wakoski, Frank O'Hara, Ted Berrigan, Gertrude Stein, André Breton, Jess Collins, Michael McClure, Lenore Kandel, ruth weiss, Amiri Baraka, Tristan Tzara, Wallace Stevens, Julian Beck, Ron Padgett, Paul Bowles, Philip Lamantia, Gregory Corso, Marian Zazeela, Charles Bukowski, John Ashbery, Jack Smith, Antonin Artaud, Jackson Mac Low, William Carlos Williams, Gerard Malanga, Pier Paolo Pasolini, Francis Picabia, Taylor Mead, and Lawrence Ferlinghetti (among many many others).

== Issues ==
There are 35 issues in the Beatitude magazine.

- Issue 1 (9 May 1959), ed. John Kelly
- Issue 2 (16 May 1959), ed. John Kelly
- Issue 3 (23 May 1959), ed. John Kelly
- Issue 4 (30 May 1959), ed. John Kelly
- Issue 5 (6 June 1959), ed. John Kelly
- Issue 6 (1959) ed. Unlisted
- Issue 7 (4 July 1959), ed. Bob Kaufman, John Kelly, William J. Margolis
- Issue 8 (15 August 1959), ed. Unlisted
- Issue 9 (18 September 1959), ed. John Kelly
- Issue 10 (October 1959), ed. Bob Kaufman
- Issue 11 (November 1959), ed. Bob Kaufman
- Issue 12 (December 1959), ed. Bob Kaufman
- Issue 13 (February 1960), ed. Bob Kaufman
- Issue 15 (June 1960), ed. Chester Valentine John Anderson
- Issue 16 (September 1960), ed. Chester Valentine John Anderson, Bob Kaufman
- Issue 17 (1960), ed. Chester Valentine John Anderson, Bob Kaufman
- Issue 18 (1966), ed. Chester Valentine John Anderson, Bob Kaufman
- Issue 19 ed. Unlisted
- Issue 20 ed. Unlisted
- Issue 21 ed. Luke Breit
- Issue 22 ed. Neeli Cherry
- Issue 23 (February 1976), ed. Jack Hirschman & Kristen Wetterhahn
- Issue 24 ed. Luke Breit
- Issue 25 ed. Thomas Rain Crowe
- Issue 26 ed. Ken Wainio
- Issue 27 ed. H. David Moe
- Issue 28 ed. Grant Fisher
- Issue 29 20th Anniversary issue dedicated to Bob Kaufman ed. Neeli Cherkovski
- Issue 30 ed. T. Walden
- Issue 31 ed. T. Walden
- Issue 32 ed. Nathan May
- Issue 33 Silver Anniversary ed. Jeffrey Grossman
- Issue 34 ed. Kathy Goss & Paul Landry
- Issue 35 eds. Mel Clay, Bob Booker & Ronald F. Sauer

== Anthology ==
The Beatitude Anthology book was published in 1960.
