= Wilma Elizabeth McDaniel =

American poet

- Born: Wilma Elizabeth McDaniel; December 22, 1918; Lincoln County, OK
- Died: April 13, 2007 (aged 88)
- Resting place: Tulare, CA
- Occupation: "Dust Bowl Poet"

Wilma Elizabeth McDaniel (December 22, 1918 – April 13, 2007) was a long-time resident of California's Central Valley. Wilma was one of thousands who emigrated from Oklahoma to California during the Dust Bowl years of the mid-1930s. Named the Tulare County poet laureate in the 1970s, McDaniel was dubbed "The Okie Poet" because of her writings about Oklahoma throughout her lifetime.

McDaniel published more than fifty books of poetry and was the subject of a film documentary by Chris Simon, Down an Old Road: The Poetic Life of Wilma Elizabeth McDaniel.

== Biography ==
Wilma Elizabeth McDaniel was born December 22, 1918, in Lincoln County, Oklahoma. Her parents were Benjamin and Anna (Finster) McDaniel. She was the fourth born out of eight children. McDaniel studied at Green Ridge School, and another in Depew, Oklahoma. When Wilma was 17 years old, in 1936, her father removed the family to California in the wake of the Great Depression and Dustbowl. Fortunately the McDaniels had family in California that helped to make the transition easier. They were able to secure employment through these family members. Wilma picked grapes at a vineyard for her Uncle Jeremiah Finster. Wilma also worked for a time as a housekeeper and maid. Her father died 10 years after moving to California and Wilma lived with her mother until her death in 1983.

=== Poetic career ===
McDaniel's love of poetry began at an early age. At age eight, she began to write on scraps of paper, envelopes, and grocery bags, storing them away for later publication. In the 1970s -when Wilma was in her 50s- she took some of her poems to the Tulare Advance-Register newspaper editor, Tom Hennion. Seeing her inborn talent, Hennion continued to publish her work in the newspaper which lead to her wider publication later on in life. McDaniel wrote with simple language and harsh imagery and was referred to as the "California Walt Whitman" by Gerald Haslam.
