= Small Press Review =

American literary magazine

- Cover page of the first issue
- Editor: Len Fulton
- Categories: Literary
- Frequency: Monthly (from 1975)
- Founder: Len Fulton
- First issue: 1967
- Final issue: 2015
- Company: Dustbooks
- Country: United States
- Based in: Paradise, California, U.S.
- Language: English
- ISSN: 0037-7228
- OCLC: 1608098

Small Press Review was a literary magazine focused on books from independent and small publishers. Later issues included the Small Magazine Review, focused on magazines. Established in 1967 by Len Fulton, who also edited the magazine, Small Press Review was published by his company Dustbooks out of Paradise, California. It was published bimonthly, later becoming a monthly magazine in 1975. The magazine was one of the major efforts chronicling the world of small publishing. It ceased publication in 2015, four years after Fulton's death.

== History ==
The magazine was established in 1967 by Len Fulton to enable a more "dynamic" analysis of the small press. Many small press materials available at that time were not widely available in libraries, and did not receive views in other literary review publications, often due to being literary chapbooks. Fulton said of this that:

It is either out of ignorance or creed that this happens or doesn’t happen—and it is our hope that Small Press Review will assault both barriers. [...] We hope to render it useful to libraries, universities and others as a periodic record of small-press publications and activities.

Previously a bimonthly magazine, it became a monthly in 1975. The magazine lost $6,000 in 1974, but broke even upon its change to a monthly magazine in 1975. In June 1981, they issued a special librarian issue, focused on issues faced by small press and librarians together, with contributions from librarians and academics.

In 1993, it received a spinoff, Small Magazine Review, which covered magazines rather than books. The next year, this was merged into Small Press Review. Fulton died in 2011. The magazine continued following his death, but ended its run in mid-2015.

== Contents and profile ==
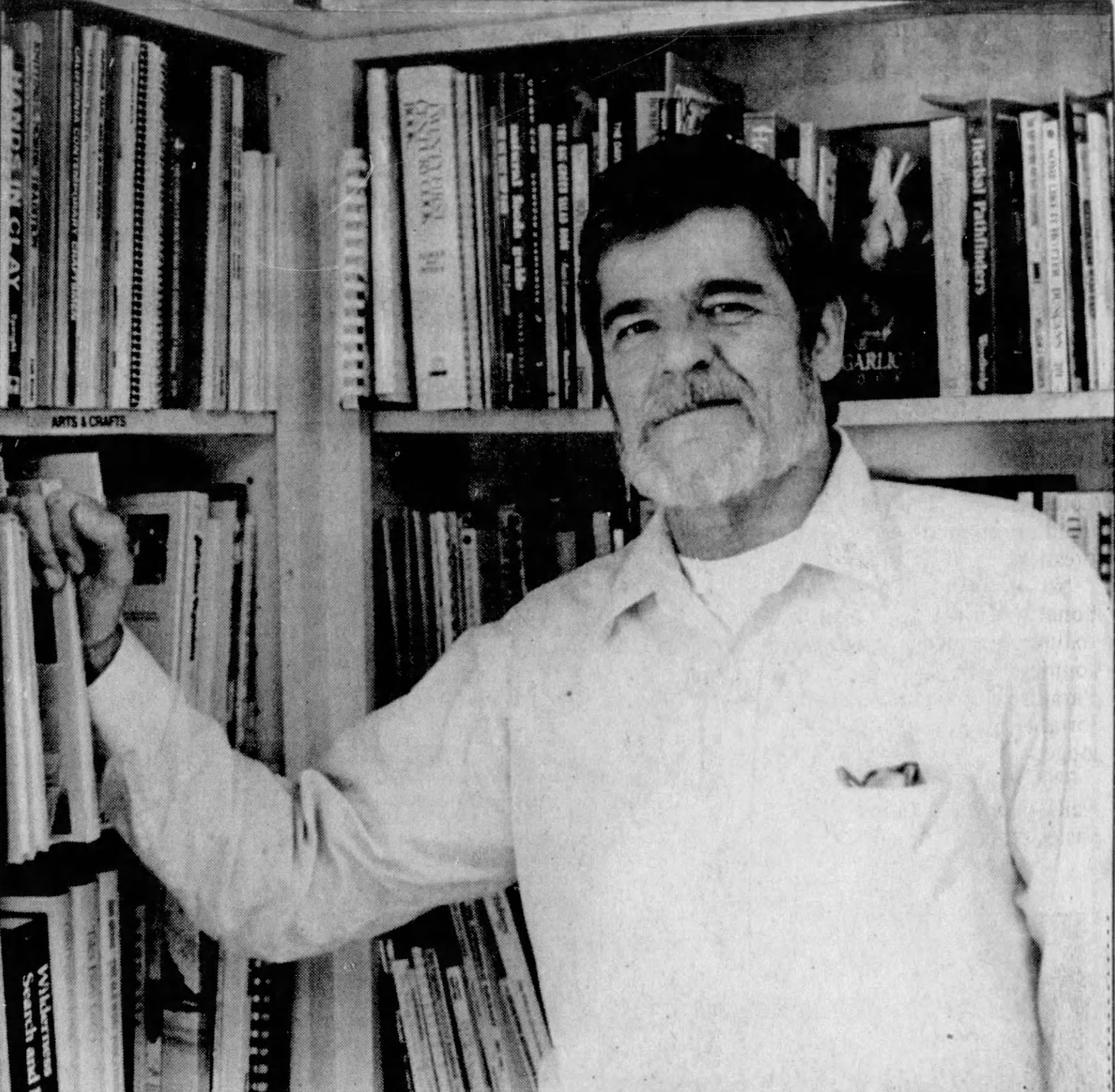
Len Fulton, publisher and editor of Small Press Review, in 1986

Small Press Review focused on books from independent and small publishers. The Small Magazine Review sister publication, later merged into the magazine, covered magazines. However, in the first issue, Fulton wrote that "Any serious attempt to define or analyze small-press literary publications is doomed. The business will not submit to taxonomy".

Its main focus was reviews, carrying between six and twelve per issue, medium-length. According to Grant Burns, reviews were in "a literary vein". In addition to reviews, it included essays, a "Notes and News" section on small publishing, as well as a "New Listings" section that carried updates to the small press directory. It also carried advertisements and a letters section. According to Burns, it was known for "frequently heated guest editorials".

Edited by Fulton, the magazine was published by Fulton's company Dustbooks, founded in 1964. It was Dustbooks's main outlet and was published out of Paradise, California. In addition to the magazine, Dustbooks published annually the International Directory of Little Magazines and Small Presses. Small Press Review was published monthly, bimonthly until 1975. Each issue was printed on 8-1/2x11 newsprint and was 16 pages long. After the merger with Small Magazine Review, issues were 32 pages long.

== Reception ==
In 1986, Grant Burns for The Library Quarterly wrote that it, with the Dustbooks directory, comprised the major effort to keep track of the small press world. Burns noted that "they are more than that, however; closer investigation shows that their full reality is something different, more diverse, more commercial, and probably less noble." He said that, by 1986, the magazine appeared to have been around "forever" and had not appreciably changed since its inception, describing it as possessing "a regularity that defies the standard of erraticism set by many little magazines".

Reviewing the magazine as a whole but the librarian special issue in specific, Dean H. Keller complimented the academic and varied coverage but wished for more descriptions of collections. Burns praised its content, saying it was "usually interesting, almost always opinionated, and often fun", providing a window into the mindset of the small press, but criticized its graphic design as "sorry". He wrote that the reader "yearns for someone with graphic skills to redesign it and make it look as though the publisher cares about its appearance", criticizing the layout and "inane decorative devices". Both Burns and Keller recommended it to most libraries.
