= William Wantling =

American poet

William Wantling

William Wantling (November 23, 1933 – May 2, 1974) was an American poet, novelist, ex-Marine, ex-convict, and college instructor born in East Peoria, Illinois. After graduating high school he joined the Marine Corps until 1955. He served in Korea during 1953. After leaving the Marines he moved to California and eventually had a son with his then-wife Luana. Wantling went to San Quentin State Prison in 1958 convicted of forgery and possession of narcotics. During his imprisonment Luana divorced him and took custody of the child. He was released in 1963, and returned to Peoria. There he married Ruth Ann Bunton, a fellow divorcee, in 1964. In 1966 he enrolled at Illinois State University, where he received both a BA and MA. He taught at the university up until his death on May 2, 1974. Wantling died of heart failure, possibly brought about by his extensive drug use.

== Wantling's life as a Marine ==
Wantling alleged that he was the youngest Marine Sergeant (at 18) in combat. He also claimed that he spent ten days in a coma and eight weeks in the hospital recovering from burns after the jeep he was riding in hit a land mine, causing a 50-gallon barrel of gasoline on the jeep to ignite. However scholar W. D. Ehrhart had established that Wantling never saw combat and did not receive a Purple Heart medal, which would have been awarded to any soldier injured as a result of enemy action.

== Appearance in other writers' work ==
A character based on Wantling has appeared in the poetry of Charles Bukowski, who was an acquaintance. Wantling and his second wife also appeared as characters in Bukowski's 1978 novel Women.

== Poetry ==
Much of his poetry deals with his time spent in Korea during the war. Pusan Liberty is a first person account of the life of a heroin dealer in Pusan, South Korea. And without laying claim is a short and shocking poem about the indifference with which the American forces treated killing.

Initiation is about a couple trying to raise money to sustain their drug (presumably heroin) addiction. Unwilling to rob a stranger, the girlfriend offers to sell her body.

Poetry is about the failure of classic poetic devices to capture the reality and brutality of prison life.

The three poems mentioned above are included in the collection The Awakening by William Wantling (Rapp & Whiting, London, 1968) and the last two are included in San Quentin's Stranger by William Wantling (Caveman Press, Dunedin, 1973). Obscene & Other Poems (Caveman Press, 14 pages, Dunedin, 1972) contains 5 poems in an edition of 600 copies.

Walter Lowenfels listed Wantling as "one of the best poets of his generation."

== Biographical inaccuracies ==
W. D. Ehrhart attempted to reconstruct Wantling's life by looking at military and prison records. He concluded that:

...what little we know about his life has already become distorted and mythologized, fiction made fact by constant repetition."

== See also ==
- Beat Generation

== Bibliography ==
- Ehrhart, W. D.: "Setting the Record Straight on William Wantling", War, Literature & the Arts (Fall/Winter 2000), 224-230 . Archived from the original on September 29, 2011.
- Franklin, H. Bruce. Prison Literature in America (Oxford University Press, 1989), 262–266.
- Jones, Kevin. "Finding Jewels in the Awkward Mud: A Reconsideration of the Life and Works of William Wantling" (PhD thesis) Illinois State University, 1994.
- Kerr, Kathryn (2023-01-01). "Wantling part of '60s literary scene". The Pantagraph. pp. A18.
- Lovelock, Yann. "William Wantling (1932-74)," Oasis 12 (1974). Archived from the original on May 18, 2011.
- Pyros, John. William Wantling: A Biography & Selected Works (Spoon River Poetry Press, 1981).
- Ridgwell, Joseph. "The Remarkable Resurrection of William Wantling," 3:AM Magazine (October 7, 2009)
- Roskos, David. "Tumbling the Void: William Wantling and the Algebra of Need," Dionysos 10 no. 1 (Winter 2000), 33–44.
