= Jack Micheline =

American painter and poet

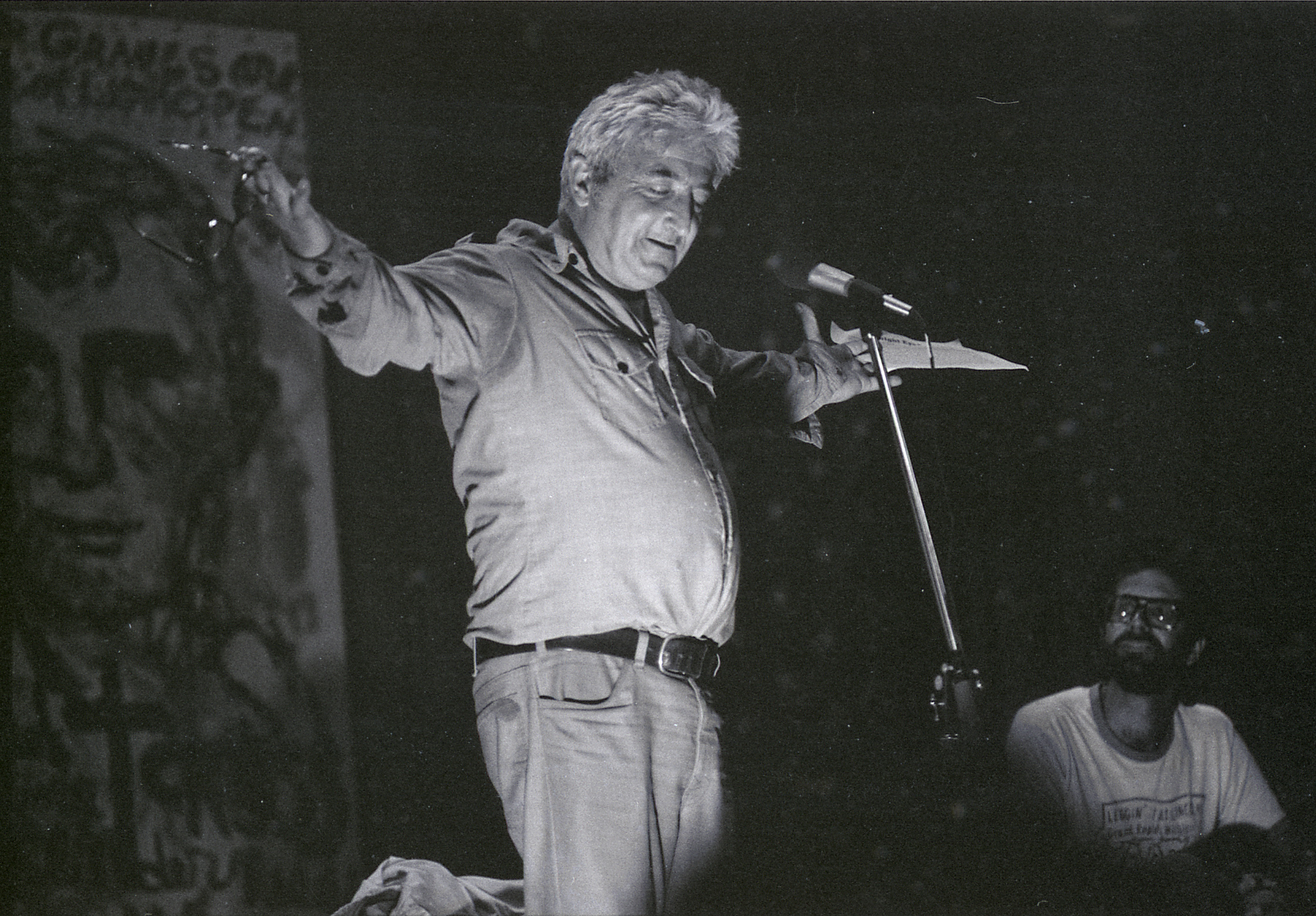
Micheline at the Jack Kerouac Conference in 1982, Boulder, Colorado.

Jack Micheline (November 6, 1929 – February 27, 1998), born Harvey Martin Silver, was an American painter and poet from the San Francisco Bay Area. One of San Francisco's original Beat poets, he was an innovative artist who was active in the San Francisco Poetry Renaissance of the 1950s and 1960s.

== Beat poet ==
Born in The Bronx, New York, of Russian and Romanian Jewish ancestry. Micheline took his pen name from writer Jack London and his mother's maiden name. He moved to Greenwich Village in the 1950s, where he became a street poet, drawing on Harlem blues and jazz rhythms and the cadence of word music. He lived on the fringe of poverty, writing about hookers, drug addicts, blue collar workers, and the dispossessed.

In 1958, Troubadour Press published his first book, River of Red Wine. Jack Kerouac wrote the introduction, describing Micheline's work as characterized by "the swinging free style I like and his sweet lines revive the poetry of open hope in America". River of Red Wine was reviewed by Dorothy Parker in Esquire magazine.

Jack Micheline relocated to San Francisco in the early 1960s, where he spent most of the rest of his life. He published over twenty books, some of them mimeographs and chapbooks.

Though a poet of the Beat Generation, Micheline characterized the Beat movement as a product of media hustle, and hated being categorized as a Beat poet. He was also a painter, working primarily with gouache in a self-taught, primitive style he picked up in Mexico City.

== Obscenity arrest ==
In September 1968, a short story he wrote, "Skinny Dynamite", was published in Renaissance 2, the literary supplement of John Bryan's Los Angeles alternative newspaper Open City. Solicited from Micheline by guest editor Charles Bukowski, its subject was a promiscuous young woman. The story used the word "fuck" and Bryan was arrested for obscenity, but was not convicted.

Second Coming Press published a book of Micheline's stories, entitled Skinny Dynamite after his most notorious work, in 1980.

== Death ==
Micheline died of a heart attack in San Francisco, California while riding a BART subway train from San Francisco to Orinda in 1998. The back room at San Francisco's Abandoned Planet Bookstore (until it was closed) showcased Micheline's wall mural paintings.

=== Marriage and children ===
Micheline was married twice, to Pat Cherkin in the early 1960s, and later to Marian "Mimi" Redding. He had a son, Vincent, who was born in 1963 to his first wife, Pat.

== Published works ==
- Tell your mama you want to be free, and other poemsongs (1969); Dead Sea Fleet Editions.
- Last House in America (1976); Second Coming Press.
- North of Manhattan: Collected Poems, Ballads, and Songs (1976); Manroot.
- Skinny Dynamite and Other Stories (1980); Second Coming Press.
- River of Red Wine and Other Poems (1986); Water Row Press.
- Imaginary Conversation with Jack Kerouac (1989); Zeitgeist Press.
- Outlaw of the Lowest Plant (1993); Zeitgeist Press.
- Ragged Lion (1999); Vagabond Press.
- Sixty-Seven Poems for Downtrodden Saints (1997); FMSBW.2nd enlarged edition (1999).
- To be a poet is to be: Poetry (2000); Implosion Press.
- One of a Kind (2008); Ugly Duckling Presse.
