= Bob Hýsek =

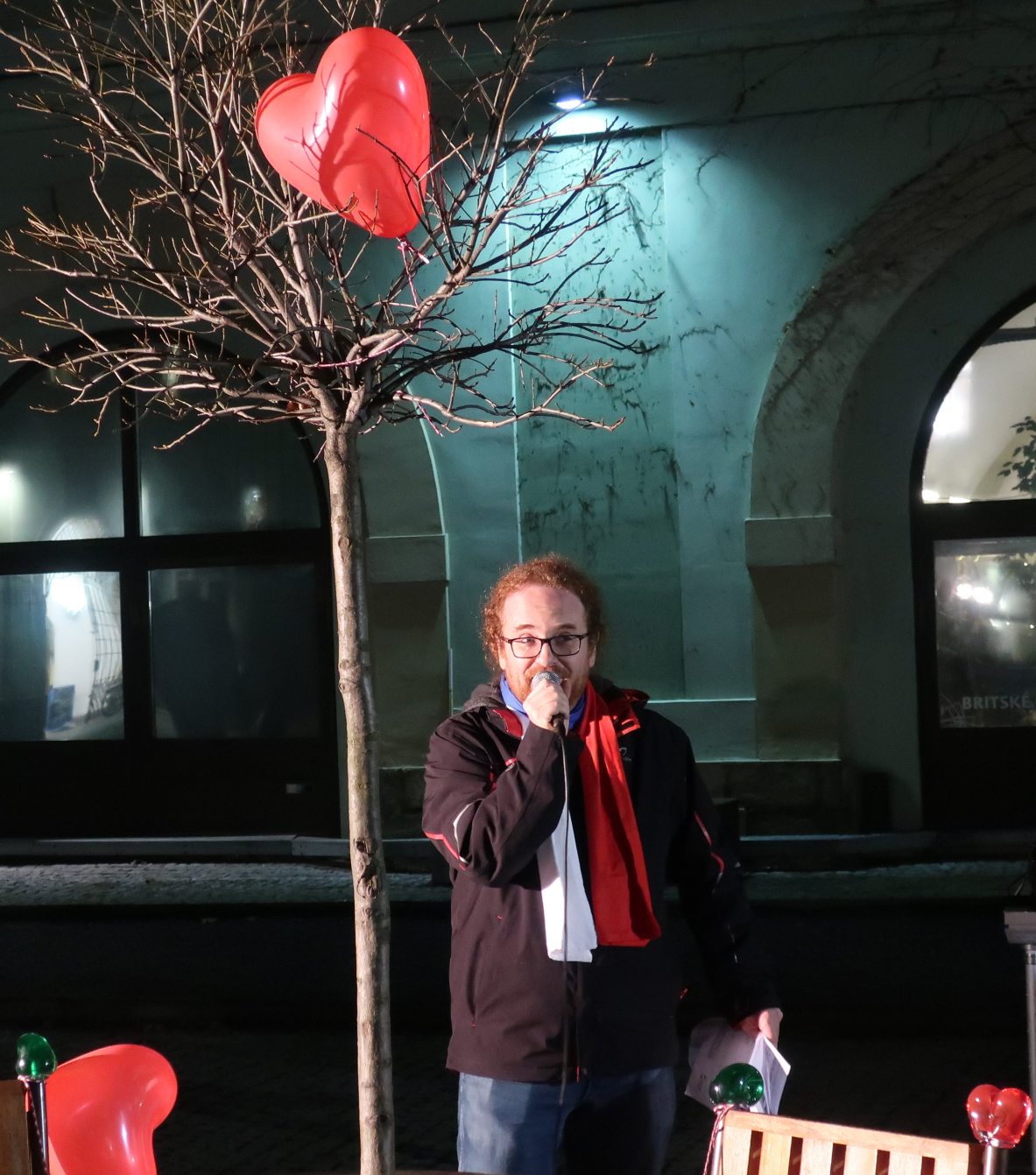
Bob Hýsek
- Born: Robert Hýsek; 4 July 1974 (age 52); Uherské Hradiště, Czechoslovakia
- Citizenship: Czech Republic
- Education: Palacký University Olomouc
- Occupations: Translator, Editor, Publisher
- Organization: Cannabis Therapy Magazine

Bob Hýsek (Robert Hýsek; born 4 July 1974, in Uherské Hradiště, Czechoslovakia), is a Czech translator from English, an editor, publisher, publicist, and organiser and populariser of slam poetry. He teaches at the Department of English and American Studies, Palacký University Olomouc Faculty of Arts.

== Life, Work Experience ==
He grew up in Orlová, and studied English and Czech at the Palacký University Olomouc Faculty of Arts (1992–1999). He currently teaches slam poetry and literary translation from English to Czech at his alma mater. Previously, he also taught poetry translation, American Studies, and science fiction there.

He has translated poetry and prose from English into Czech, notably Philip K. Dick, Jack Kerouac, Nick Cave, Allen Ginsberg, and especially Charles Bukowski. He is also the author of the study Karel Bukowski - stary chachar ostravski [Karel Bukowski – Notes on a Dirty Old Ostrava Man], in which he reveals the "true" identity of the American writer as the Ostrava-born emigrant Karel Bukowski.

In 2012, he started as the proofreader of the bi-monthly Legalizace magazine, and from 2017 to 2022 he was its managing editor. He is the co-founder (2018, with publicist Lukáš Hurt and publisher Robert Veverka) and editor of the popular-professional magazine Konopí [Cannabis] and editor-in-chief of its English version, Cannabis Therapy Magazine. He writes for cannabis periodicals under the pseudonym Bohumil Sazinka.

=== Translations ===
At the start of his translation career, he worked for the publishing house Pragma (translations of Osho, Bukowski); since 2003 he has been working in cooperation with the Prague publishing house Argo, becoming one of its house translators. He has been systematically translating the poetry and prose of Charles Bukowski for many years. He has contributed significantly to Czech editions of the American science fiction author Philip K. Dick; in addition to translations, editing PKD's short story collections. He has translated two collections of stories by Ted Chiang, and his translation of Nicholson Baker's erotic novel House of Holes (Czech: Libidárium) attracted considerable attention. He works with several Czech publishers as a freelance translator and editor.

In 2001, he placed second in the national Jiří Levý competition for young translators for his translation of a section of John Fante's Ask the Dust [Czech: Zeptej se prachu], which he later translated in its entirety.

With Olomouc American Studies scholars Matthew Sweney and Pavel Gončarov, and German Studies scholar Ingeborg Fialová, he founded the non-profit Ateliér uměleckého překladu [Literary Translation Atelier] in 2018. He remains its director.

=== Cultural Activities ===
In tandem with Matthew Sweney, he organised the international Ostrovy bez hranic / Islands Without Borders festival in Olomouc from 2006 to 2019 (the first two years as Slova bez hranic / Words Without Borders). In 2006, in order to attain that goal, they founded the non-profit Detour Productions, a nod to the classic film noir Detour by Olomouc native Edgar G. Ulmer. Since 2015, the non-profit has been specialising in slam poetry events, under new management.

=== Slam Poetry ===
Hýsek is one of the leading Czech organisers, moderators, and popularisers of slam poetry. Since 2006, he has been organising the regional Olomouc slam poetry rounds, and since 2015 with Tomáš Kůs, the Czech Slam Poetry championship. He is the originator and organiser of slam championships in special formats: since 2014 he has been running the Duoslam national slam doubles championship, and since 2016 the Femislam female slam championship. He also popularises and organises translators' slams. He is the editor of the slam poetry text collection Deset deka slamu (Průřez olomouckou slam poetry) [Slam on Rye: Slices of Olomouc Slam Poetry] and is the author of the electronic publication Slam poetry. Manuál k výuce performativní soutěžní poezie [Slam Poetry. A Manual for Teaching Performative Competition Poetry]. He teaches Slam Poetry as an optional subject at Palacký University Olomouc and mentors young slammers at the Olomouc Slam Poetry Club. He also cooperates with Czech slammers such as Ondřej Hrabal, Anatol Svahilec, and Dr. Filipitch in organising slam exhibitions.

== Works (selection) ==
- Karel Bukowski – Notes on a Dirty Old Ostrava Man. (Lecture series with poems, not yet published in book form).

=== Anthologies ===
- Deset deka slamu (Průřez olomouckou slam poetry) [Slam on Rye: Slices of Olomouc Slam Poetry]. Selected and with an introduction by Robert Hýsek. Olomouc: UP Press, 2015. Available online.
- Bludné kořeny / Wayward Roots. (Anthology of contemporary Slavonic poetry.) Selected and translated by Robert Hýsek, Matthew Sweney, et al.. Olomouc: UP Press, 2014. Available online.
- Prchavé domovy: Mezi vyhnanstvím a vnitřním exilem. / Fleeting Homes: Between Banishment and Inner Exile. Selected and translated by Robert Hýsek & Matthew Sweney. Olomouc: UP Press, 2010. Available online.
- Festivalový sborník / Festival Anthology: Ostrovy bez hranic/Islands Without Borders 2008. Selected and translated by Bob Hýsek and Matthew Sweney. Olomouc: Detour Productions, 2008.
- Festivalový sborník / Festival Anthology: Slova bez hranic/Words Without Borders 2007. Selected and translated by Bob Hýsek and Matthew Sweney. Olomouc: Detour Productions, 2007.

=== Translations – Books ===
- Bukowski, Charles. O pití [On Drinking]. Prague: Argo, 2022. (Trans. Bob Hýsek et al.)
- Ginsberg, Allen. Kadiš a jiné básně [Kaddish and Other Poems]. Prague: Argo, 2020. (Trans. Jan Zábrana and Bob Hýsek.)
- Chiang, Ted. Výdech [Exhalation]. Brno: Host, 2020.
- Chiang, Ted. "Když se vám líbí, co vidíte: Dokument." In Příběhy vašeho života [Stories of Your Life and Others]. Brno: Host, 2020.
- Kerouac, Jack. Dobrá bloncka [Good Blonde & Others]. Prague: Argo, 2019. (Trans. Josef Rauvolf, Petr Onufer, Vít Penkala, Michala Marková, Bob Hýsek, Jiří Popel, Lucie Simerová, David Petrů.)
- Cave, Nick. Píseň z pytlíku na zvratky [The Sick Bag Song]. Prague: Argo, 2017.
- Bukowski, Charles. Nikomu nezvoní hrana [The Bell Tolls for No One]. Prague: Argo, 2017. (Trans. Bob Hýsek, Michala Marková, Martin Svoboda, Ladislav Nagy, Roman Jakubčík.)
- Bukowski, Charles. O kočkách [On Cats]. Prague: Argo, 2017.
- Bukowski, Charles. Jelito [Ham on Rye]. Prague: Argo, 2016.
- Dick, Philip K. Minority Report: Menšinová zpráva I.–II. Prague: Argo, 2015. (Trans. Bob Hýsek, Filip Krajník, Tomáš Roztočil, Jakub Marx, Lukáš Hurt, et al.)
- Bukowski, Charles. Na poště [Post Office]. Prague: Argo, 2014.
- Bukowski, Charles. Absence hrdiny [Absence of the Hero]. Prague: Argo, 2014. (Trans. Bob Hýsek, Michala Marková, Martin Svoboda.)
- Bukowski, Charles. Další zápisky starého prasáka [More Notes of a Dirty Old Man]. Prague: Argo, 2012. (Trans. Bob Hýsek, Martin Svoboda, Ladislav Nagy.)
- Baker, Nicholson. Libidárium [House of Holes]. Prague: Argo, 2013.
- Cunetomo, Yamamoto. Hagakure – Cesta samuraje [Hagakure – The Book of the Samurai]. Bratislava: CAD Press, 2013. (2nd, revised ed.)
- Bukowski, Charles. Odbarvená píča [A White Pussy]. Prague: Argo, 2012.
- Bukowski, Charles. Příliš blízko jatek [People Look Like Flowers At Last]. Prague: Argo, 2012.
- Kerouac, Jack. Sám na vrcholu hory [Alone on a Mountaintop]. Prague: Argo 2011. (Trans. Jan Válek, Jitka Zehnalová, Bob Hýsek.)
- Niffenegger, Audrey. Její děsivá souměrnost [Her Fearful Symmetry]. Prague: Argo 2011.
- Bukowski, Charles. Tvrdej chleba [Continual Condition]. Prague: Argo, 2011.
- Dick, Philip K. Podivný ráj a jiné povídky [The Father-thing and Other Stories]. Prague: Argo, 2010. (Trans. Bob Hýsek, Filip Krajník, and Štěpán Valášek.)
- Fante, John. Zeptej se prachu / Ask the Dust. Prague: Argo, 2010. (2nd, revised ed., bilingual.)
- Dick, Philip K. Dr. Krvemsta aneb Jak se nám vedlo po bombě [Dr. Bloodmoney, Or How We Got Along After the Bomb]. Prague: Argo, 2009.
- Bukowski, Charles. Pobryndané spisy [Portions from a Wine-stained Notebook: Short Stories and Essays]. Prague: Argo, 2009. (Trans. Bob Hýsek, Michala Marková, Martin Svoboda, Martina Knápková, Ladislav Nagy.)
- Stephen, Ian. Napospas vlnám / Adrift. Olomouc: Periplum 2007.
- Bukowski, Charles. Nejkrásnější ženská ve městě [The Most Beautiful Woman in Town]. Prague: Argo, 2007. (Trans. Bob Hýsek, Martin Svoboda, Martina Knápková, Michala Marková.)
- Bukowski, Charles. Příběhy obyčejného šílenství [Tales of Ordinary Madness]. Prague: Argo, 2006. (Trans. Bob Hýsek, Michala Marková, Martin Svoboda.)
- Dick, Philip K. Planeta, která neexistovala I.–II [Second Variety]. Prague: Argo, 2006. (Trans. Bob Hýsek, Martina Knápková, Martin Svoboda.)
- Bukowski, Charles. Zápisky starého prasáka [Notes of a Dirty Old Man]. Prague: Argo, 2005. (2nd, revised ed.)
- Dick, Philip K. Když mrtví mládnou [Counter-Clock World]. Prague: Argo, 2005.
- Dick, Philip K. Král úletů [Confessions of a Crap Artist]. Prague: Argo, 2004.
- Bukowski, Charles. Kam zmizela ta roztomilá, rozesmátá holka v květovaných šatech [Betting on the Muse]. Prague: Pragma, 2003.
- Sounes, Howard. Bláznivý život Charlese Bukowského [Charles Bukowski: Locked in the Arms of a Crazy Life]. Prague: Pragma, 1999.
- Cleary, Thomas. Japonské umění války [The Japanese Art of War]. Prague: Pragma, 1998.
- Osho. Hořčičné semínko [The Mustard Seed]. Prague: Pragma, 1996. (Trans. Robert Hýsek and Jan Straka.)
