= Charles Bukowski's influence on popular culture =

Charles Bukowski's work has influenced popular culture many times over in many forms, and his work has been referenced in film, television, music and theater.

== Film ==
The 1980 film Cannibal Apocalypse features a character called Charlie Bukowski.

Several films have been made about Bukowski's life, most involving Bukowski's literary alter ego, Henry Chinaski. Barfly, which is probably the best known Bukowski autobiographic film, starring Mickey Rourke as Chinaski, centered on Bukowski's time in Los Angeles while drinking and writing. While early on in the filming, Bukowski (who also wrote the screenplay) spoke approvingly of Rourke's portrayal; he would later go on to say that he felt the actor overplayed the character.

Bukowski's film incarnations have stretched to even foreign lands outside of the United States. In 1981, Italian director Marco Ferreri created Tales of Ordinary Madness, which was based on several of Bukowski's short stories collected in The Most Beautiful Woman in Town. In 1987, a small Belgian film named Crazy Love was released. Directed by Dominique Deruddere, the script was co-written by Charles Bukowski and is now considered one of the best films in world cinema dating back to the 1980s.

In 1995, actor Sean Penn (a good friend of Bukowski's) directed his second feature film, an independent piece named The Crossing Guard starring Jack Nicholson, Robin Wright, and David Morse. The closing credits of the film contain a dedication to Charles Bukowski.

In 2005, a cinematic adaption of his novel Factotum, directed by Bent Hamer and starring Matt Dillon as Henry Chinaski, was released to largely favorable reviews, scoring a 75% "Fresh Rating" on the film review site Rotten Tomatoes.

The 2009 French film Cartagena (French: L'homme de chevet) features Sophie Marceau as a quadriplegic woman named Muriel who loves the writings of Bukowski. She has her caregiver, an alcoholic and former boxer named Léo (played by Christopher Lambert), read passages of Bukowski to her, and she often compares Léo's mannerisms and personality to the poet, implying that their similarities are why she hired him in the first place.

In the 2018 film Beautiful Boy, Nic Sheff recites part of the Bukowski poem, "Let it Enfold You" to his class at Hampshire College. The poem, in its entirety, is recited in the end credits of the film.

== Music ==
Charles Bukowski has left an impression on many musicians throughout the years through his work. Bono, lead singer of the commercially and critically acclaimed Irish rock band U2, credits Bukowski with a part in his love for American literature, saying "Here was a guy who was like 'Look, I have no time for metaphors. Can we just get straight down to the bone... the marrow of the bone' ". U2 would later pay tribute to Bukowski in "Dirty Day", the ninth track off their widely successful album Zooropa (1993).

American singer-songwriter Tom Waits considers Charles Bukowski a huge influence as well. He cites Bukowski's work as "very musical" in nature and calls Bukowski "one of the most colourful and important writers of modern fiction, poetry, prose, in contemporary literature...". He also cites a Bukowski poem as the inspiration for the song "Frank's Wild Years" off his 1983 album Swordfishtrombones. Even their subject matter is similar in structure and content as both Waits and Bukowski write about dark places, sadness, drifters and loneliness. The opening line of Waits's Rock and Roll Hall of Fame biography also puts the two on similar platforms, reading "Tom Waits is a gruff-voiced, big-hearted singer/pianist who is to songwriting what Charles Bukowski is to poetry".

A number of bands have name-dropped Charles Bukowski and his work over the years. American indie rock band Modest Mouse has made two songs that references the writer: one plainly titled "Bukowski" and another off their album The Lonesome Crowded West, titled "Long Distance Drunk". The Good Life have a track called "Album of the Year", from their album also titled Album of the Year, which mentions Charles Bukowski. The Red Hot Chili Peppers mention Bukowski in their song "Mellowship Slinky in B Major" off their 1991 album Blood Sugar Sex Magik. English alternative rock band The Boo Radleys have a song called "Charles Bukowski is Dead" from their 1995 album Wake Up!. English band The Dogs D'Amour references Charles Bukowski and his misadventures in the track called "Bullet Proof Poet", from their third studio album A Graveyard Full of Empty Bottles. Dave Alvin has a song named "Burning in Water Drowning in Flame" off his 1993 album Museum of the Heart that also references the writer. The Florida band Hot Water Music takes their name from a Bukowski short story collection of the same name. The British pop-punk group Moose Blood references Bukowski on the track entitled "Bukowski" on their album I'll Keep You in Mind, From Time to Time. The 2017 English band Kasabian mention "reciting Charles Bukowski" in their song "You're in love with a Psycho". English rock band Arctic Monkeys reference Bukowski in their song "She Looks Like Fun" on the 2018 album Tranquility Base Hotel & Casino.

== Television ==
Charles Bukowski has been depicted on television as well, namely on the Showtime comedy-drama series Californication. The show's main character Hank Moody, played by actor David Duchovny, is an author based in Los Angeles who subscribes to the same kind of lifestyle that Bukowski became known for. The show depicts profuse indulgence of alcoholism, sex and narcotics, which many critics have described as a television adaption of Bukowski's third novel Women. In the ninth episode of the first season, Moody's girlfriend can be seen reading Sifting Through the Madness For The World, The Line, The Way: New Poems, a collection of Bukowski's posthumously-published work.

== Theater ==
Charles Bukowski's work and life has also translated into a few plays and theatre pieces as well. Barflies was created by Scottish-specific theatre group Grid Iron and it centers on Bukowski's literary alter ego and main protagonist, Henry Chinaski. It is said to be based on three short stories, two poems and about a dozen other extracts from Bukowski's work and explores the alcoholism and women in Bukowski's life. Paul Peditto created a play entitled Buk: The Life and Times of Charles Bukowski. The play involves the life and times of a younger and older version of Bukowski's alter ego, Chinanski, sometimes finding the two interacting with each other. During the writing of the play Peditto wrote many letters to Bukowski, and both the playwright and author continued their exchange until Bukowski's death. For the Live Bait Theater-Prop Theatre co-production of the play, the letters where hung in the lobby outside the theater for the audience to read before and after the show. B.S.: Bukowski.Sondheim, an ongoing production created by Joanne Gordon, the artistic director of the California Repertory Company, was released November 2 through December 8, 2012, at the Queen Mary's theatre in Long Beach, California. The work fuses together the poetry of Bukowski and the music and lyrics of American composer Stephen Sondheim. Both Sondheim and the Bukowski estate have provided their consent for the making of this production and the use of their respective works.
