= Moose Blood discography =

- Studio albums: 3
- EPs: 3
- Singles: 3
- Music videos: 7

The discography of Moose Blood, a British rock band, consists of three studio albums, three extended plays and three singles.

== Studio albums ==
List of studio albums
Title	Album details	Peak chart positions						
Title	Album details	UK	UK Rock	US	US Alt	US Heat	US Indie	US Rock
I'll Keep You in Mind, From Time to Time	Release: 7 October 2014; Label: No Sleep (NSR127); Format: CD, DL, LP	—	22	—	—	45	—	—
Blush	Release: 5 August 2016; Label: Hopeless/No Sleep (HR2228); Format: CD, DL, LP	10	1	175	14	2	11	19
I Don't Think I Can Do This Anymore	Release: 9 March 2018; Label: Hopeless (NSR127); Format: CD, DL, LP	32	2	—	—	—	—	—
"—" denotes a release that did not chart or was not released in that territory.

== Extended plays ==
List of extended plays
Title	Album details
Bukowski Demo (Summer '12)	Release: August 2012; Label: Self-released; Format: DL
Moving Home	Release: 11 February 2013; Label: Fist in the Air (FITA14); Format: CD, CS, DL, 7" vinyl
Departures / Moose Blood (split EP with Departures)	Release: 12 November 2013; Label: No Sleep (NSR110); Format: DL, 7" vinyl

== Singles ==
List of singles, showing year released and album name
Title	Year	Peak chart positions	Album
Title	Year	US Sales	Album
"Boston"/"Orlando"	2013	—	Non-album single
"Honey"	2016	3	Blush
"Glow"/"Knuckles"	2016	—	Blush
"—" denotes releases that did not chart or weren't released in that country.

== Music videos ==
List of music videos, showing year released and director
Title	Year	Director
"Swim Down"	2014	
"I Hope You're Missing Me"	2014	
"Bukowski"	2015	Bethan Miller
"Gum"	2015	
"Honey"	2016	Lewis Cater
"Knuckles"	2016	Lewis Cater
"Cheek"	2016	
"Talk In Your Sleep"	2017	Lewis Cater
"Have I Told You Enough"	2018	Lewis Cater
