= John Bryan (journalist) =

American journalist

- Born: November 12, 1934; Cleveland, Ohio U.S.
- Died: February 1, 2007 (aged 72); San Francisco, California, U.S.
- Occupations: Publisher, Editor, Journalist
- Notable work: Open City Press; Open City; The Sunday Paper; The Phoenix; This Soldier Still At War; Whatever Happened To Timothy Leary?
- Movement: Underground press
- Spouse(s): Joan Barr, Niami Hanson

John Charles Bryan (November 12, 1934 – February 1, 2007) was an American newspaper publisher, editor, and journalist best known for founding and running the Los Angeles alternative newspaper Open City. He also published the San Francisco-based Open City Press and the Sunday Paper. In 1981, the San Francisco Chronicle called Bryan "The King of the Underground Press." Warren Hinckle of the Chronicle called Bryan a "one-man-newspaper newspaperman," noting that his apartment was crammed with printing equipment. Paul Krassner said that Bryan was a journalist in the tradition of I.F. Stone.

== Biography ==
The son of a Cleveland, Ohio newspaperman, the Cleveland-born Bryan worked as a journalist for a wide variety of major newspapers: the San Diego Tribune, the Los Angeles Mirror, the Los Angeles Herald Examiner, the Houston Post, the Houston Chronicle, the San Francisco Chronicle, and the San Francisco Examiner.

=== Open City Press ===
Bryan quit The San Francisco Chronicle in 1964 in order to found the weekly tabloid Open City Press. Open City Press covered San Francisco's bohemian community. A local forerunner of the Berkeley Barb, it provided coverage of the Free Speech Movement.

In the beginning Bryan bought a case of metal monotype and hand-set his own copy, pulling proofs to paste up for cheap offset reproduction. Bryan published 15 issues of Open City Press between November 18, 1964, and March 17–23, 1965.

=== Los Angeles and Open City ===
After the closure of Open City Press Bryan relocated to Southern California. After a stint working for Art Kunkin as managing editor of the Los Angeles Free Press, he launched Open City in Los Angeles, starting the volume numbering with vol. 2, no. 1 (May 5–11, 1967). The newspaper is best remembered for publishing the "Notes of a Dirty Old Man" column by Charles Bukowski.

At its peak Open City circulated 35,000 copies. Unlike almost all other underground papers which were published in tabloid newspaper format, Open City was printed in the larger broadsheet-sized format.

In March 1968, Bryan was prosecuted on an obscenity charge for printing an image of a nude woman in a record company advertisement for Leon Russell. Six months later, in September 1968, there was a second obscenity bust over the short story "Skinny Dynamite" by Jack Micheline, about the sexual antics of an underage girl, in Renaissance 2, a literary supplement to Open City edited by Bukowski. Bukowski had solicited the story from Micheline. The cost of Bryan's legal defense and a $1,000 fine on the first charge eventually put the shoestring operation out of business.

After the paper folded, Bukowski published a satirical and cruel fictional account of Open City in Evergreen Review under the title "The Birth, Life and Death of an Underground Newspaper."

=== Sunday Paper and later projects ===
Bryan's follow-up to Open City was the ambitious but brief-lived Sunday Paper, which published seven issues in San Francisco in February–March 1972. Published in the large broadsheet format, each issue was fronted by a two-page section of underground comix edited by Willy Murphy and printed in full color. Contributors to The Sunday Paper included some of the top underground cartoonists of that era: Murphy, Larry Todd, Gilbert Shelton, Justin Green, Trina Robbins, Bobby London, Bill Griffith, Shary Flenniken, Ted Richards, Jay Lynch, and Art Spiegelman. (Original copies of this collection of The Sunday Paper issues can be reviewed within the countercultural division of Stanford University's archives.)

One of Bryan's last underground publications was Appeal to Reason, and his final newspaper was Peace News, which was published in the wake of the September 11, 2001, attacks and distributed at anti-war rallies. It lasted only one issue as Bryan was waylaid by health problems, after his eviction by a landlord who took issue with the paper's content. He spent his last years working in the San Francisco book store Abandoned Planet.

In addition to his newspaper work, Bryan also published three books: Trans (Essex House, 1969), a novel, under the pseudonym "Jerry Anderson"; Whatever Happened To Timothy Leary? (Renaissance Press, 1980), a biography of Timothy Leary; and This Soldier Still At War (Harcourt Brace Jovanovich, 1975), a biography of Symbionese Liberation Army member Joseph Remiro.
