= Lukáš Hurt =

Czech translator, editor and publisher

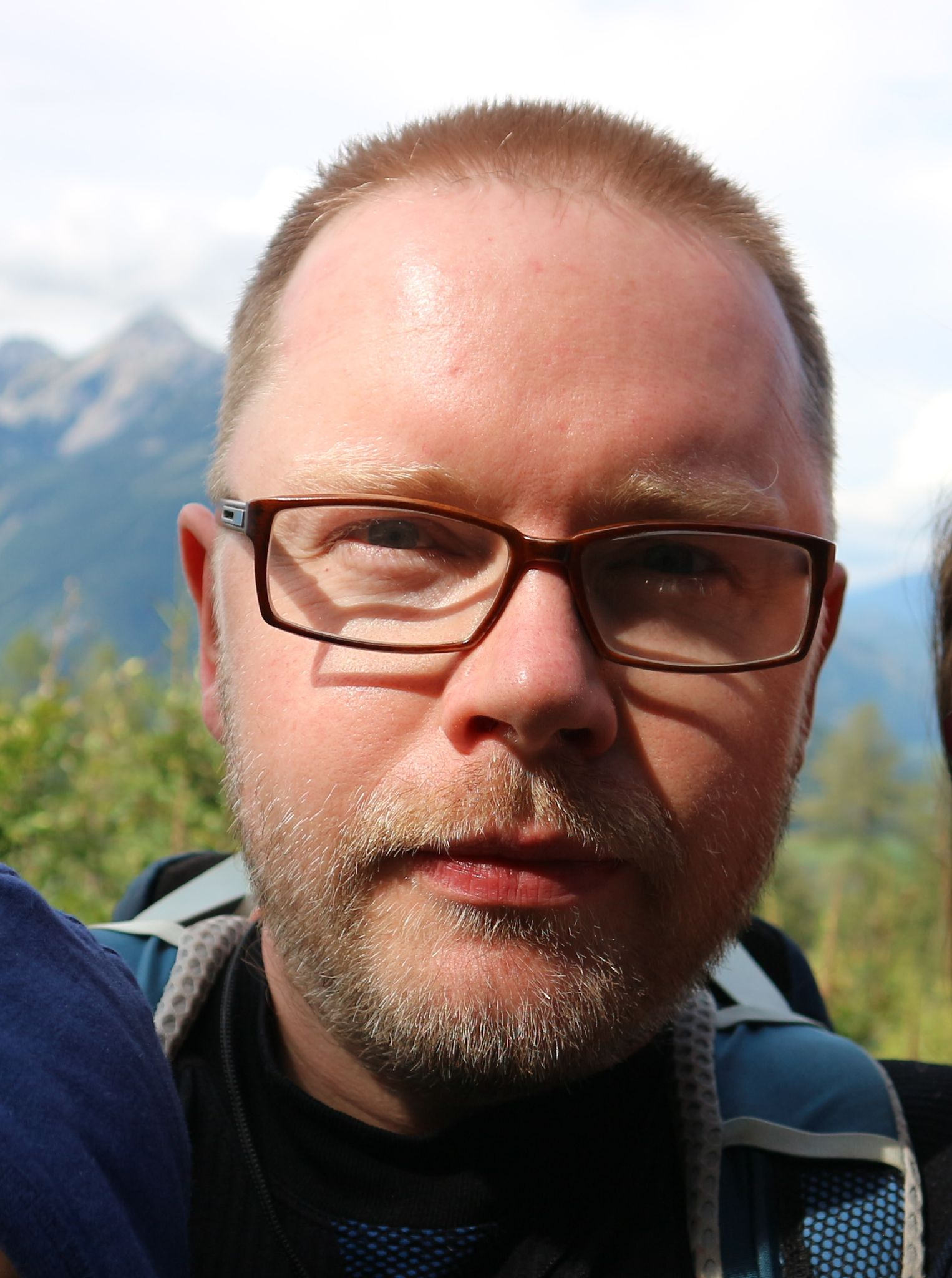
- Hurt in 2020
- Born: 4 June 1984 (age 42); Ústí nad Orlicí, Czechoslovakia
- Education: Palacký University Olomouc
- Occupations: Publisher, editor, translator, cannabis activist, chess player

Lukáš Hurt (born 4 June 1984) is a Czech translator, editor and publisher. He has degrees in history and English. For over a decade, he has been a cannabis activist, focusing mostly on human rights and medical use.

== Early life ==
Hurt was born on 4 June 1984 in Ústí nad Orlicí. He was raised in Česká Třebová, where he graduated from high school in 2003. Afterwards, he attended Palacký University Olomouc, graduating with bachelor's degrees in history and English in 2008, and where he graduated with a master's degree in English in 2013.

From 2006 to 2011, he lived and worked in a family-owned hotel on the west coast of Ireland, where he began to take a serious interest in hill walking and photography. fotografování. Hurt travelled to both islands of New Zealand in 2009 and 2010, after which he published a travel diary with photographs for his friends.

=== Translation and organizational activities ===
After returning to the Czech Republic in 2012, he began as a translator and editor for Argo publishers in Prague and the magazines Bylinky revue and Legalizace. His translation work on the topic of cannabis gradually increased to the point where his dedicated clients included trade fairs (e.g. Cannafest), conferences (Konopí a věda, EuroAmCBC), patient groups (KOPAC), doctors, and academic institutions such as Mendel University in Brno, Palacký University Olomouc, and St. Anne's University Hospital in Brno.

In 2016, he was the Central European correspondent in a pilot project for Leafly, the largest international cannabis information web. He is also the author or translator of a number of publications and brochures, and from 2014 to 2018 was the main translator of the biggest cannabis trade fair in the world, Prague's Cannafest, and in 2018 he was also the organizational manager of the EuroAmCBC conference held in Prague.

=== Konopí/Cannabis Therapy magazine ===
In 2018, he became editor-in-chief of the magazine Konopí (English version: Cannabis Therapy), and also its co-publisher with Bob Hýsek and Robert Veverka. Konopí is a bi-monthly magazine focussing on informing the public about medical marihuana, cannabis therapy, and other uses of the plant. The magazine's content consists of articles and interviews intended for doctors, healthcare professionals, and patients who have made the decision to include cannabis products as a component of their therapeutic methods. The magazine was the first public medium in the Czech Republic focussed on the theme of cannabis therapy.

Due to the magazine's nature, Hurt had the opportunity to question a number of Czech and international cannabis experts in lengthy interviews, including Czech-Israeli chemist Lumír Ondřej Hanuš, Czech national anti-drug coordinator Jindřich Vobořil, leader of the Czech Pirate Party and current Czech deputy prime minister Ivan Bartoš, oncologist Ondřej Sláma, neurologist Marta Vachová, pharmacologist and veterinarian Leoš Landa, researcher and director of the Cannabis Research Center in Brno Václav Trojan, state pharmacist Veronika Prokešová, world-renowned cannabis breeder and grower Scott Blakey, former Czech Ministry of Health employee Petr Polanský, and agronomist Marie Bjelková, among others.

=== CzecHemp ===
In March 2023, he took the position of manager of CzecHemp, industry cluster for the development of the hemp sector in the Czech Republic, founded in 2018. Since its inception, it has been associating private hemp companies, research institutions, educational institutions, and government officials with the aim of developing the hemp sector not only in the Czech Republic, but in the whole of Europe. His work thjere includes communication with members of the cluster, managing basic operations and participation in international projects, media spokesperson, organizing educational events and conferences, among others.

=== Chess ===
Since 2019, he has been organizing the annual Max Švabinský Cup chess tournament. As a youngster, he took third place in the 1999 Czech championship in the category H16 and at the age of 14 he received the title of Candidate Master. As an adult, He has been playing for the Ústí nad Orlicí Czech second-league team, and playing for his home team, Česká Třebová was able to advance in 2009 to the second league for the first time in history. From 2000 to 2004 and 2018 to 2020, he was a chess trainer for youths.
