= More Notes of a Dirty Old Man =

More Notes of a Dirty Old Man: The Uncollected Columns
- More Notes of a Dirty Old Man: The Uncollected Columns
- Author: Charles Bukowski
- Language: English
- Genre: Essays
- Publisher: City Lights
- Publication date: August 2011
- Pages: 248
- ISBN: 978-0-87286-543-3

More Notes of a Dirty Old Man: The Uncollected Columns is written by Charles Bukowski, edited by David Stephen Calonne, and published by City Lights. A sequel to his 1969 book, Notes of a Dirty Old Man, it includes columns (including his column of the same name for the Los Angeles Free Press) and essays that had never been collected and published together.

== Critical reception ==
Following its 2011 publication More Notes of a Dirty Old Man received much attention from the press. Dean Schaffer from SF Weekly stated that Bukowski's "tales of sex, drugs, and booze, and more sex, drugs, and booze, ad infinitum, resonate a lurid energy that grabs our attention and keeps it." Sophie Duvernoy of LA Weekly says "To anyone familiar with Bukowski's work, they're more of the good stuff--essays on pure desire that demonstrate his lust for the physical world."

In a self-interview from The Nervous Breakdown, the book's editor, David Calonne, reveals more about his time working on Bukowski's work: "That's the amazing thing I've discovered doing these Bukowski anthologies--that there are these fantastic gems which have not been published in book form because Bukowski was so incredibly prolific. He resembles writers like D.H. Lawrence or Robert Graves or Henry Miller or William Saroyan--these incredibly productive geniuses who seemed incapable of writing a dull line."
