= Tales of Ordinary Madness =

1981 film by Marco Ferreri

Storie di ordinaria follia (Tales of Ordinary Madness)
- Directed by: Marco Ferreri
- Screenplay by: Sergio Amidei; Marco Ferreri; Anthony Foutz
- Produced by: Jacqueline Ferreri
- Starring: Ben Gazzara; Ornella Muti; Susan Tyrrell; Tanya Lopert
- Cinematography: Tonino Delli Colli
- Edited by: Ruggero Mastroianni
- Music by: Philippe Sarde
- Production companies: 23 Giugno; Ginis Films
- Release date: 1981
- Running time: 101 minutes
- Countries: Italy; France
- Language: English

Tales of Ordinary Madness (Italian: Storie di ordinaria follia, French: Contes de la folie ordinaire) is a 1981 film by Italian director Marco Ferreri. It was shot in English in the United States, featuring Ben Gazzara and Ornella Muti in the leading roles. The film's title and subject matter are based on the works and the person of US poet Charles Bukowski, including the short story The Most Beautiful Woman in Town (published by City Lights Publishing in the 1972 collection Erections, Ejaculations, Exhibitions, and General Tales of Ordinary Madness).

The film's protagonist, Charles Serking, is based on Bukowski's autobiographical character Henry Chinaski. At the time, the director Taylor Hackford owned the rights to the Chinaski name, having acquired them when he optioned Bukowski's 1971 novel Post Office.

== Plot ==
The film follows the meandering (sexual) adventures of the poet and drunk, Charles Serking, laying bare the sleaze of life in the less reputable neighborhoods of Los Angeles. Serking's life takes a turn for the better when he meets Cass, a young hooker with self destructive habits. They have a stormy relationship. When Serking gets an offer from a major publishing house, Cass tries to stop him from leaving, but fails. Serking gives in to the temptation of the big bucks, but soon realizes his mistake and returns to L.A only to find that Cass has killed herself in his absence. Devastated, he hits the bottle in a nightmarish drinking bout, but finally reaches catharsis and returns to the seaside guesthouse where he spent his happiest moments with Cass. It is here that he rekindles his poetry with the aid of a young admirer in one of Ferreri's trademark beach scenes.

== Reception ==
While successful in Europe, the film met with an indifferent reception in the US despite its American setting. Janet Maslin of the New York Times gave the film a negative review.

The best that can be said for Marco Ferreri's Tales of Ordinary Madness is that somewhere inside its unworkable blend of pretension and pornography, there's a serious film about art and sexual abandon struggling to get out. The worst, which can be said with considerably more accuracy, is that Mr. Ferreri's film is strained, absurdly solemn and full of inadvertent howlers.

== Awards ==
The film won 4 David di Donatello and 2 Nastro d'Argento both including Best Director.

=== David di Donatello ===
- Marco Ferreri: Best Director
- Sergio Amidei & Marco Ferreri: Best Script
- Tonino Delli Colli - Best Cinematography
- Ruggero Mastroianni - Best Editing
