= Tales of Ordinary Madness (short story collection) =

1983 short story collection by Charles Bukowski

- First edition
- Author: Charles Bukowski
- Language: English
- Genre: Dirty realism, surrealism, transgressive fiction
- Publisher: City Lights Books
- Publication date: 1983
- Publication place: United States
- Media type: Print (paperback)
- Pages: 238
- ISBN: 0-87286-155-4

Tales of Ordinary Madness is one of two collections of short stories by Charles Bukowski that City Lights Publishers culled from its 1972 paperback volume Erections, Ejaculations, Exhibitions, and General Tales of Ordinary Madness. (The other volume is entitled The Most Beautiful Woman in Town). Both volumes were first published in 1983 and remain in print.

== Contents ==
- A .45 To Pay The Rent
- Doing Time With Public Enemy No. 1
- Scenes From The Big Time
- Nut Ward Just East Of Hollywood
- Would You Suggest Writing As A Career?
- The Great Zen Wedding
- Reunion
- Cunt And Kant And A Happy Home
- Goodbye Watson
- Great Poets Die In Steaming Pots Of Shit
- My Stay In The Poet's Cottage
- The Stupid Christs
- Too Sensitive
- Rape! Rape!
- An Evil Town
- Love It Or Leave It
- A Dollar And Twenty Cents
- No Stockings
- A Quiet Conversation Piece
- Beer And Poets And Talk
- I Shot A Man In Reno
- A Rain Of Women
- Night Streets Of Madness
- Purple As An Iris
- Eyes Like The Sky
- One For Walter Lowenfels
- Notes Of A Potential Suicide
- Notes On The Pest
- A Bad Trip
- Animal Crackers In My Soup
- A Popular Man
- Flower Horse
- The Big Pot Game
- The Blanket
