= Charles Bukowski =

American writer (1920–1994)

- Born: Heinrich Karl Bukowski; August 16, 1920; Andernach, Prussia, Weimar Germany
- Died: March 9, 1994 (aged 73); Los Angeles, California, U.S.
- Education: Los Angeles City College (attended)
- Occupations: Poet; novelist; short story writer; columnist
- Movement: Dirty realism, transgressive fiction
- Spouses: Barbara Frye (m. 1955; div. 1958) Linda Lee Beighle (m. 1985)
- Children: 1

Henry Charles Bukowski (/buːˈkaʊski/ boo-KOW-skee; born Heinrich Karl Bukowski, German: [ˈhaɪnʁɪç ˈkaʁl buˈkɔfski]; August 16, 1920 – March 9, 1994) was a German-American poet, novelist, and short story writer. His writing was influenced by the social, cultural, and economic ambience of his adopted home city of Los Angeles. Bukowski's work addresses the ordinary lives of poor Americans, the act of writing, alcohol, relationships with women, and the drudgery of work.

Bukowski published extensively in small literary magazines and with small presses beginning in the early 1940s and continuing on through the early 1990s. He wrote thousands of poems, hundreds of short stories and six novels, eventually publishing over sixty books during the course of his career, including his Poems Written Before Jumping Out of an 8 Story Window, published by his friend and fellow poet Charles Potts, and Burning in Water, Drowning in Flame. His poems and stories were republished by John Martin's Black Sparrow Press (now HarperCollins/Ecco Press) as collected volumes of his work. As a reviewer noted, "Bukowski continued to be, thanks to his antics and deliberate clownish performances, the king of the underground… stressing his loyalty to those small press editors who had first championed his work."

Time called Bukowski a "laureate of American lowlife." Adam Kirsch of The New Yorker wrote, "the secret of Bukowski's appeal [is that] he combines the confessional poet's promise of intimacy with the larger-than-life aplomb of a pulp-fiction hero."

During his lifetime, Bukowski received little attention from academic critics in the United States, but was better received in Western Europe, particularly the United Kingdom, and especially Germany, where he was born. Since his death in March 1994, Bukowski's life and writings have been the subject of a number of articles and books.

== Life and career ==
=== Family and early years ===
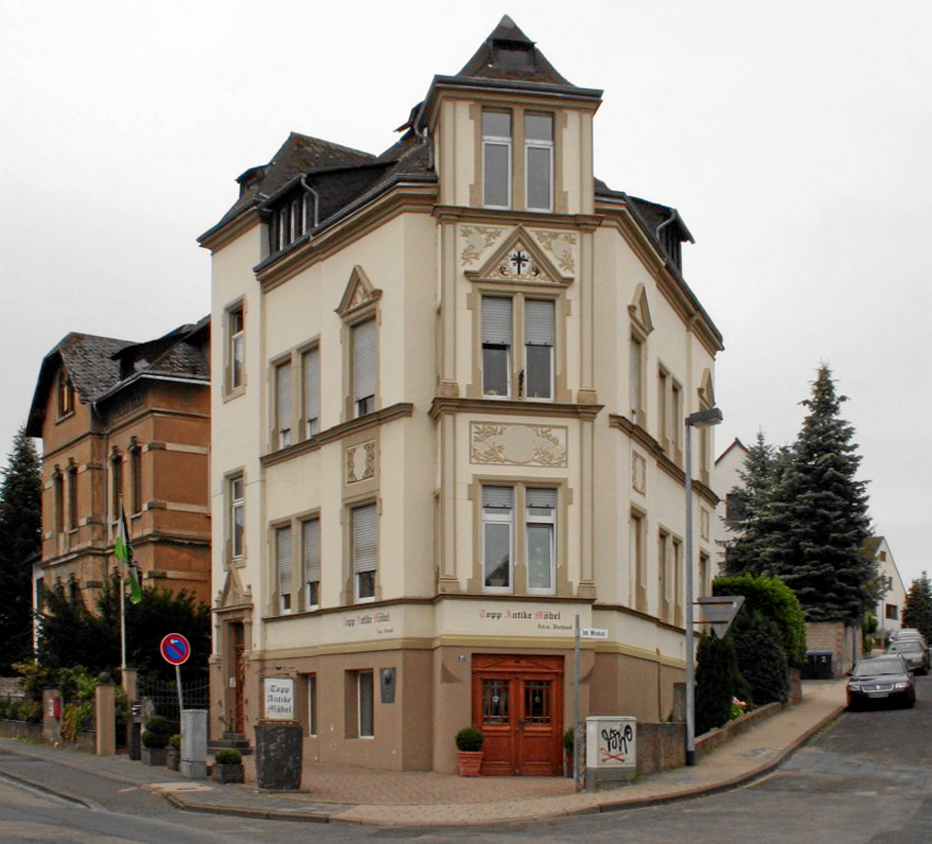
Bukowski's birthplace at Aktienstrasse, Andernach

Bukowski was born on August 16, 1920, as Heinrich Karl Bukowski in Andernach, Prussia, Weimar Germany. His father was Heinrich (Henry) Bukowski (1895–1958), an American of German descent who had served in the U.S. Army of occupation after World War I and had remained in Germany after his army service. His mother was Katharina (née Fett; 1895–1956). His paternal grandfather, Leonard Bukowski, had moved to the United States from Imperial Germany in the 1880s. In Cleveland, Ohio, Leonard met Emilie Krause, an ethnic German who had emigrated from Danzig (now Gdańsk, Poland). They married and settled in Pasadena, California, where Leonard worked as a successful carpenter. The couple had four children, including Heinrich (Henry), Charles Bukowski's father. His mother, Katharina Bukowski, was the daughter of Wilhelm Fett and Nannette Israel. The name Israel is widespread among Catholics in the Eifel region. Bukowski assumed his paternal ancestor had moved from Poland to Germany around 1780, as "Bukowski" is a Polish last name. As far back as Bukowski could trace, his whole family was German.

Bukowski's parents met in Andernach following World War I. His father was German-American and a sergeant in the United States Army serving in Germany after the empire's defeat in 1918. He had an affair with Katharina, a German friend's sister, and she subsequently became pregnant. Bukowski repeatedly claimed to be born out of wedlock, but Andernach marital records indicate that his parents married one month before his birth.

Afterwards, Bukowski's father became a building contractor, set to make great financial gains in the aftermath of the war, and after two years moved the family to Pfaffendorf (today part of Koblenz). However, given the crippling postwar reparations being required of Germany, which led to a stagnant economy and high levels of inflation, he was unable to make a living and decided to move the family to the U.S. On April 18, 1923, they sailed from Bremerhaven to Baltimore, Maryland, where they settled.

Bukowski's family moved to Mid-City, Los Angeles, in 1930. Bukowski's father was often unemployed. In the autobiographical Ham on Rye, Bukowski says that, with his mother's acquiescence, his father was frequently abusive, both physically and mentally, beating his son for the smallest imagined offense. He later told an interviewer that his father beat him with a razor strop three times a week from the ages of six to 11 years. He says that it helped his writing, as he came to understand undeserved pain.

Bukowski spoke English with a strong German accent and was taunted by his childhood playmates with the epithet "Heini," German diminutive of Heinrich, in his early youth. He was shy and socially withdrawn, a condition exacerbated during his teen years by an extreme case of acne. Neighborhood children ridiculed his accent and the clothing his parents made him wear. The Great Depression bolstered his rage as he grew, and gave him much of his voice and material for his writings.

In his early teen years, Bukowski had an epiphany when he was introduced to alcohol by his friend William "Baldy" Mullinax, depicted as "Eli LaCrosse" in Ham on Rye, son of an alcoholic surgeon. "This [alcohol] is going to help me for a very long time," he later wrote, describing a method (drinking) he could use to keep his demons at bay. Bukowski attended Susan Miller Dorsey High School for one year before transferring to Los Angeles High School. After graduating from high school in 1939, Bukowski attended Los Angeles City College for two years, taking courses in art, journalism, and literature, before quitting at the start of World War II. He then moved to New York City to begin a career as a financially pinched blue-collar worker with hopes of becoming a writer.

On July 22, 1944, with the war ongoing, Bukowski was arrested by FBI agents in Philadelphia, where he lived at the time, on suspicion of draft evasion. At a time when the U.S. was at war with Nazi Germany, and many Germans and German-Americans on the home front were suspected of disloyalty, Bukowski's German birth troubled the authorities. He was held for seventeen days in Philadelphia's Moyamensing Prison. Sixteen days later, he failed a psychological examination that was part of his mandatory military entrance physical test and was given a Selective Service Classification of 4-F (unfit for military service).

=== Early writing ===
When Bukowski was aged 23 (March–April 1944), his short story "Aftermath of a Lengthy Rejection Slip" was published in Story magazine. Two years later, another short story, "20 Tanks from Kasseldown", was published by the Black Sun Press in Issue III of Portfolio: An Intercontinental Quarterly, a limited-run, loose-leaf broadside collection printed in 1946 and edited by Caresse Crosby. Failing to break into the literary world, Bukowski grew disillusioned with the publication process and quit writing for almost a decade, a time that he referred to as a "ten-year drunk". These "lost years" formed the basis for his later semiautobiographical chronicles, and there are fictionalized versions of Bukowski's life through his highly stylized alter-ego, Henry Chinaski.

During part of this period, Bukowski continued living in Los Angeles, working at a pickle factory for a short time but also spending some time roaming about the U.S., working sporadically and staying in cheap rooming houses. In the early 1950s, he took a job as a fill-in letter carrier with the United States Post Office Department in Los Angeles, but resigned just before he reached three years' service.

In spring 1954, Bukowski was treated for a near-fatal bleeding ulcer. After leaving the hospital he began to write poetry. The next year he agreed to marry small-town Texas poet Barbara Frye, but they divorced in 1958. Following his divorce, Bukowski resumed drinking and continued writing poetry.

Several of Bukowski's poems were published in the late 1950s in Gallows, a small poetry magazine published briefly (the magazine lasted for two issues) by Jon Griffith. The small avant-garde literary magazine Nomad, published by Anthony Linick and Donald Factor (the son of Max Factor Jr.), offered a home to Bukowski's early work. Nomad's inaugural issue in 1959 featured two of his poems. A year later, Nomad published one of Bukowski's best-known essays, Manifesto: A Call for Our Own Critics.

=== 1960s ===
By 1960, Bukowski had returned to the post office in Los Angeles and began work as a letter filing clerk, a position he held for more than a decade. In 1962, he was distraught over the death of Jane Cooney Baker, his first serious girlfriend. Bukowski turned his inner devastation into a series of poems and stories lamenting her death.

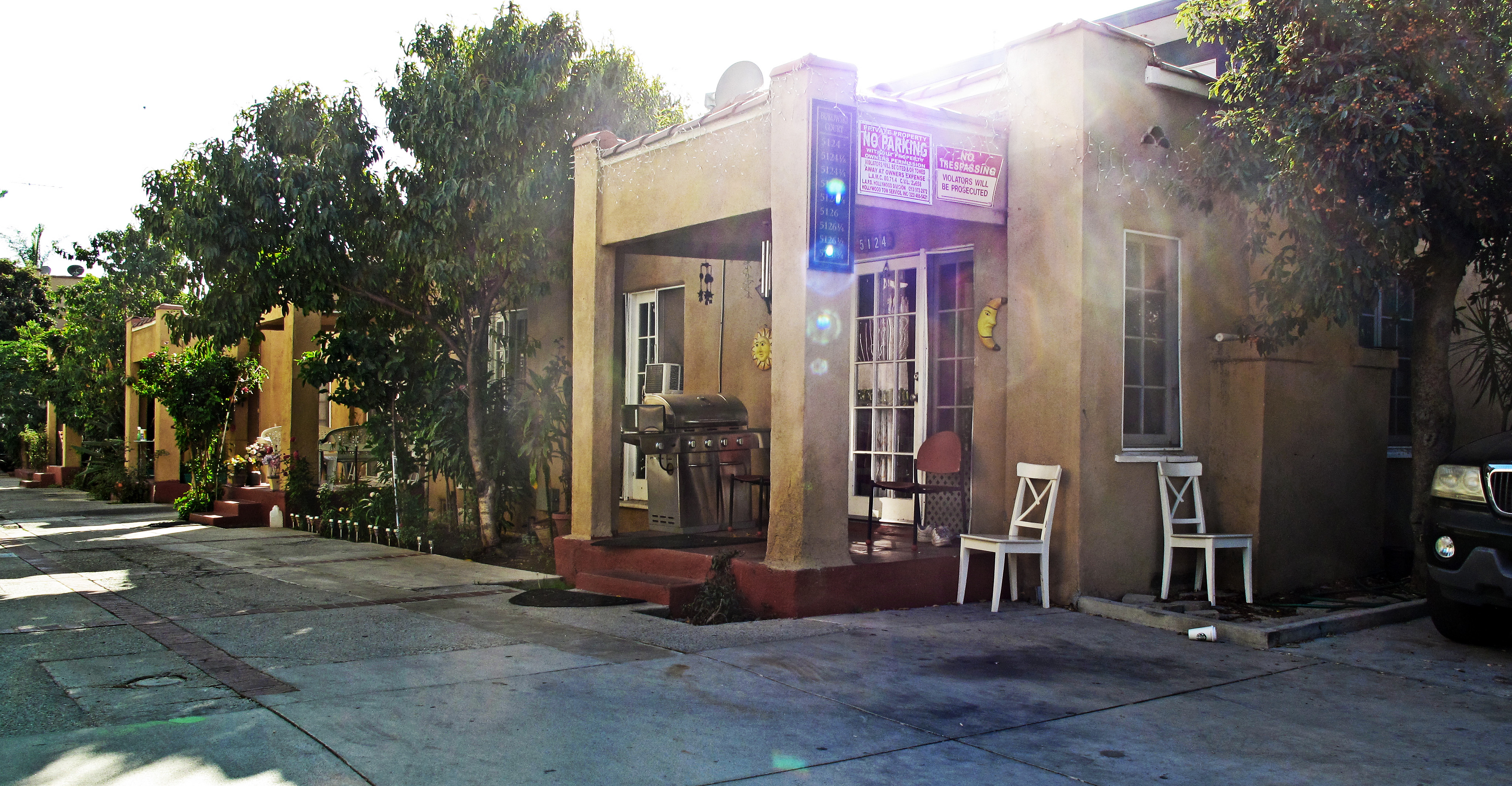
5124 DeLongpre Avenue, Los Angeles, now Bukowski Court, where Bukowski resided from 1963 to 1972

E.V. Griffith, editor of Hearse Press, published Bukowski's first separately printed publication, a broadside titled "His Wife, the Painter," in June 1960. This event was followed by Hearse Press's publication of "Flower, Fist and Bestial Wail," Bukowski's first chapbook of poems, in October 1960. "His Wife, the Painter" and three other broadsides ("The Paper on the Floor", "The Old Man on the Corner" and "Waste Basket") formed the centerpiece of Hearse Press's "Coffin 1", an innovative small-poetry publication consisting of a pocketed folder containing forty-two broadsides and lithographs which was published in 1964. Hearse Press continued to publish poems by Bukowski through the 1960s, 1970s, and early 1980s.

Jon and Louise Webb, publishers of the literary magazine The Outsider, featured some of Bukowski's poetry in its pages. Under the Loujon Press imprint, the Webbs published Bukowski's It Catches My Heart in Its Hands in 1963 and Crucifix in a Deathhand in 1965.

In 1964, a daughter, Marina Louise Bukowski, was born to Bukowski and his live-in girlfriend Frances Smith. She would be his only child.

Bukowski was published by the independent British poetry magazine Iconolatre in 1966. The editor, artist John Wilson McCracken, sent a copy of the magazine to Carl Weissner who would later become Bukowski's longtime West German translator.

Beginning in 1967, Bukowski wrote the column Notes of a Dirty Old Man for Los Angeles' Open City, an underground newspaper. The FBI kept a file on him as a result. When Open City was shut down in 1969, the column was picked up by the Los Angeles Free Press as well as the hippie underground paper NOLA Express in New Orleans. In 1969, Bukowski and Neeli Cherkovski launched their own short-lived mimeographed literary magazine, Laugh Literary and Man the Humping Guns. They produced three issues over the next two years.

=== Black Sparrow years ===
In 1969, Bukowski accepted an offer from Black Sparrow Press publisher John Martin and quit his post office job to dedicate himself to full-time writing. He was then 49 years old. As he explained in a letter at the time, "I have one of two choices – stay in the post office and go crazy ... or stay out here and play at writer and starve. I have decided to starve." Less than one month after leaving the postal service he finished his first novel, Post Office. As a measure of respect for Martin's financial support and faith in a relatively unknown writer, Bukowski published almost all of his subsequent major works with Black Sparrow Press, which became a highly successful enterprise. An avid supporter of small independent presses, Bukowski continued to submit poems and short stories to innumerable small publications throughout his career.

Bukowski embarked on a series of love affairs and one-night trysts. One of these relationships was with Linda King, a sculptor and poet. Critic Robert Peters reported seeing Bukowski as an actor in King's play Only a Tenant, in which she and Bukowski stage-read the first act at the Pasadena Museum of the Artist. This was a one-off performance of what was a shambolic work. Bukowski's other affairs were with a recording executive and a twenty-three-year-old redhead; he wrote a book of poetry as a tribute to his love for the latter, titled, "Scarlet" (Black Sparrow Press, 1976). His various affairs and relationships provided material for his stories and poems. Another important relationship was with "Tanya", pseudonym of "Amber O'Neil" (also a pseudonym), described in Bukowski's "Women" as a pen-pal that evolved into a weekend tryst at Bukowski's residence in Los Angeles in the 1970s. "Amber O'Neil" later self-published a chapbook about the affair, titled "Blowing My Hero".

In 1976, Bukowski met Linda Lee Beighle, a health food restaurant owner, rock-and-roll groupie, aspiring actress, heiress to a small Philadelphia "Main Line" fortune and devotee of Meher Baba. Two years later he moved from the East Hollywood area, where he had lived for most of his life, to the harborside community of San Pedro, the southernmost district of Los Angeles. Beighle followed him and they lived together intermittently over the next two years. They were eventually married by Manly Palmer Hall, a Canadian-born author, mystic, and spiritual teacher, in 1985. Beighle is referred to as "Sara" in Bukowski's novels Women and Hollywood.

In the 1980s, Bukowski collaborated with cartoonist Robert Crumb on a series of comic books, with Bukowski supplying the writing and Crumb providing the artwork. Through the 1990s Crumb also illustrated a number of Bukowski's stories, including the collection The Captain Is Out to Lunch and the Sailors Have Taken Over the Ship and the story "Bring Me Your Love".

Bukowski was also published in Beloit Poetry Journal.

=== Live poetry readings ===
Bukowski's live readings were legendary, with the drunk raucous crowd fighting with the drunk angry poet. In 1972, Joe Wolberg, who was the manager of City Lights Books in San Francisco, rented a hall and paid Bukowski to read his poems. A vinyl album was released by City Lights, which was re-issued by Takoma Records in 1980.

In May 1978, Bukowski traveled to West Germany and gave a live poetry reading of his work before an audience in Hamburg. This was released as a double 12" L.P. stereo record titled "CHARLES BUKOWSKI 'Hello. It's good to be back.'"

Bukowski's last international performance was in October 1979 in Vancouver, British Columbia, Canada, and was released on DVD as There's Gonna Be a God Damn Riot in Here. The reading was produced by fan/friend Dennis Del Torre, who rented a venue, Viking Hall, paid Bukowski and his wife Linda to fly up, hired a video crew, promoted the event, and sold tickets. The crowd and Bukowski were very drunk for the event. A heckler was near the stage and can be heard clearly. Del Torre later went to Bukowski's widow, Linda Bukowski, for permission to license it. He thought it was the last reading Bukowski gave, but Linda told him there was another reading after that in Redondo Beach, CA, in early 1980.

In March 1980, Bukowski gave his last reading at the Sweetwater music venue in Redondo Beach, California, which was released as Hostage on vinyl and audio CD, and The Last Straw on DVD, filmed and produced by Jon Monday for mondayMEDIA. In 2010 the unedited versions of both The Last Straw and Riot were released as One Tough Mother on DVD.

=== Death and legacy ===
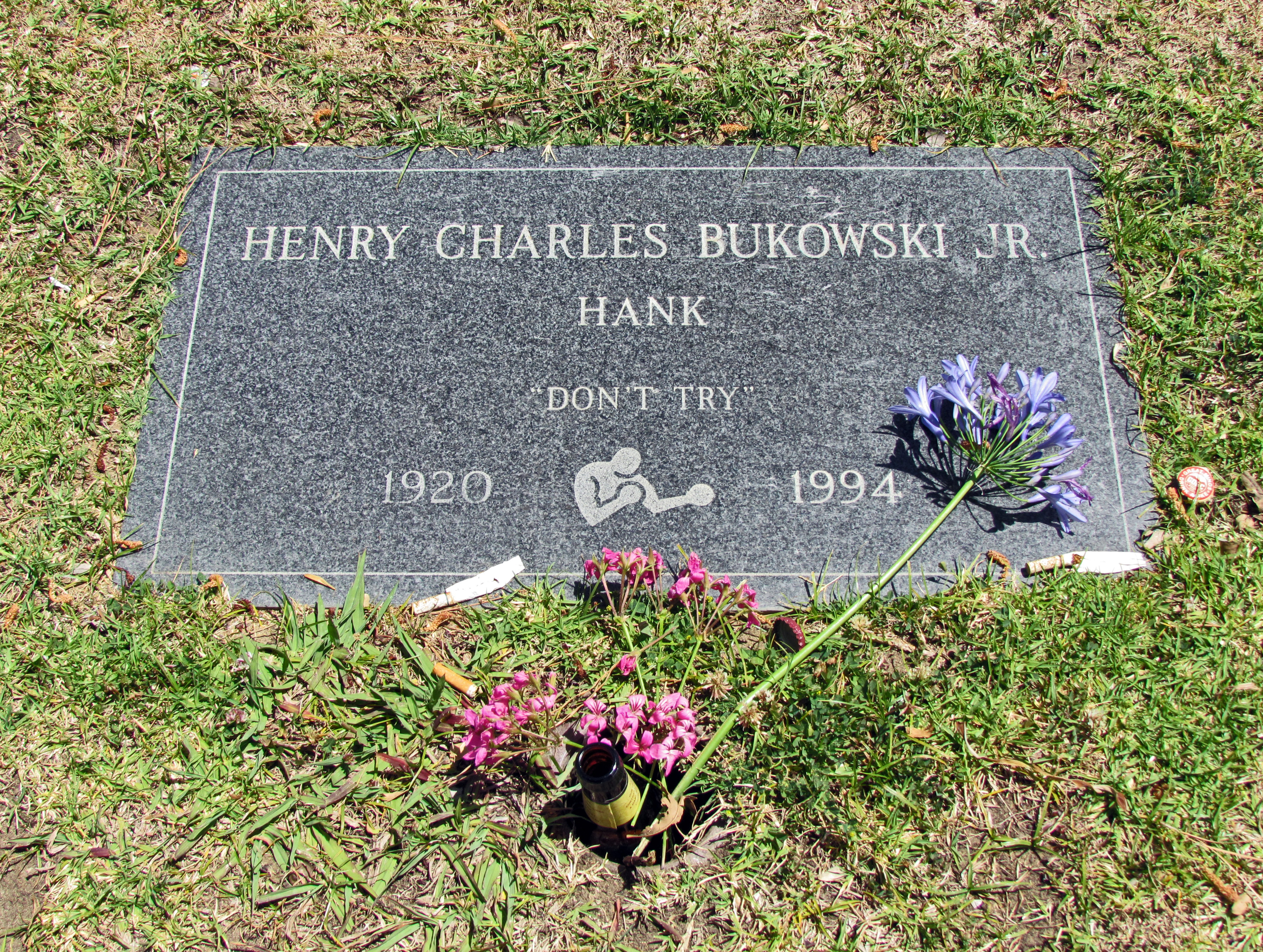
Henry Charles Bukowski Jr.'s grave in Green Hills Memorial Park

Bukowski died of leukemia on March 9, 1994, in San Pedro, aged 73, shortly after completing his last novel, Pulp. The funeral rites, orchestrated by his widow, were conducted by Buddhist monks. He is interred at Green Hills Memorial Park in Rancho Palos Verdes. An account of the proceedings can be found in Gerald Locklin's book Charles Bukowski: A Sure Bet. His gravestone reads: "Don't Try", a phrase which Bukowski uses in one of his poems, advising aspiring writers and poets about inspiration and creativity. Bukowski explained the phrase in a 1963 letter to John William Corrington: "Somebody at one of these places [...] asked me: 'What do you do? How do you write, create?' You don't, I told them. You don't try. That's very important: not to try, either for Cadillacs, creation or immortality. You wait, and if nothing happens, you wait some more. It's like a bug high on the wall. You wait for it to come to you. When it gets close enough you reach out, slap out and kill it. Or, if you like its looks, you make a pet out of it."

Bukowski's work was subject to controversy throughout his career. Hugh Fox claimed that his sexism in his poetry, at least in part, translated into his life. In 1969, Fox published the first critical study of Bukowski in The North American Review, and mentioned his attitude toward women: "When women are around, he has to play Man. In a way it's the same kind of 'pose' he plays at in his poetry—Bogart, Eric Von Stroheim. Whenever my wife Lucia would come with me to visit him he'd play the Man role, but one night she couldn't come I got to Buk's place and found a whole different guy—easy to get along with, relaxed, accessible."

In June 2006, Bukowski's literary archive was donated by his widow to the Huntington Library in San Marino, California. Copies of all editions of his work published by the Black Sparrow Press are held at Western Michigan University, which purchased the archive of the publishing house after its closure in 2003.

Ecco Press continues to release new collections of his poetry, culled from the thousands of works published in small literary magazines. According to Ecco Press, the 2007 release The People Look Like Flowers at Last will be his final posthumous release, as now all his once-unpublished work has been made available.

== Writing ==
Writers including John Fante, Knut Hamsun, Louis-Ferdinand Céline, Ernest Hemingway, Robinson Jeffers, Henry Miller, D. H. Lawrence, Fyodor Dostoevsky, Du Fu Li Bai, and James Thurber are noted as influences on Bukowski's writing.

Bukowski often spoke of Los Angeles as his favorite subject. In a 1974 interview he said, "You live in a town all your life, and you get to know every bitch on the street corner and half of them you have already messed around with. You've got the layout of the whole land. You have a picture of where you are.... Since I was raised in L.A., I've always had the geographical and spiritual feeling of being here. I've had time to learn this city. I can't see any other place than L.A."

Bukowski also performed live readings of his works, beginning in 1962 on radio station KPFK in Los Angeles and increasing in frequency through the 1970s. Drinking was often a featured part of the readings, along with a combative banter with the audience. Bukowski could also be generous; for example, after a sold-out show at Amazingrace Coffeehouse in Evanston, Illinois, on November 18, 1975, he signed and illustrated over 100 copies of his poem "Winter," published by No Mountains Poetry Project. By the late 1970s, Bukowski's income was sufficient to give up live readings.

One critic has described Bukowski's fiction as a "detailed depiction of a certain taboo male fantasy: the uninhibited bachelor, slobby, anti-social, and utterly free", an image he tried to live up to with sometimes riotous public poetry readings and boorish party behavior. A few critics and commentators also supported the idea that Bukowski was a cynic, as a man and a writer. Bukowski denied being a cynic, stating: "I've always been accused of being a cynic. I think cynicism is sour grapes. I think cynicism is a weakness."

=== Poetry editorial controversy ===
Over half of Bukowski's collections have been published posthumously. Posthumous collections have been remarked as 'John Martinized', with the poems having been highly edited, at a level which was not present during Bukowski's lifetime. One example of a popular poem, "Roll the Dice" (when comparing the original manuscript to "What Matters Most Is How Well You Walk Through the Fire"), themes such as hell and alcoholism are removed. The creative editing present includes changing lines from "against total rejection and the highest of odds" to "despite rejection and the worst odds".

== In popular culture ==
=== In music ===
- American band Red Hot Chili Peppers reference Bukowski and his works in several songs; singer Anthony Kiedis has stated that Bukowski is a big influence on his writing.
- American pop-punk band The Wonder Years reference Bukowksi's novel You Get So Alone at Times That It Just Makes Sense in their songs "Everything I Own Fits in This Backpack" and "Woke Up Older".
- British emo band Moose Blood released their song "Bukowski" on their debut EP Moving Home in 2013. The original 7" vinyl also features a quote from Bukowski's novel Post Office.
- The Poison Idea album "War All The Time" is named after a book of poems by Charles Bukowski.
- The Modest Mouse album Good News for People Who Love Bad News contains a song “Bukowski”.
- The singer Harry Styles stopped One Direction concerts to read Bukowski in 2014. He later quoted "Old Man, Dead in a Room" in his song "Woman," and opened his 2021 Love on Tour shows with a quote from "Style."
- The punk rock band Hot Water Music adopted their name from the compilation of Bukowski short stories by the same name.
- MF Doom's final solo studio album, Born Like This, was named after the opening line of Bukowski's poem "Dinosauria, We." Also, the track "Cellz" on the album features a sample of Bukowski reading the poem.
- The Death Grips song "Birds" is inspired by Bukowski's poem "Bluebird."
- The 2017 Kasabian song “You’re In Love With A Psycho” mentions Bukowski.
- The Volcano Choir song "Alaskans" features a recording of Bukowski reading a poem on French television.
- "Bluebird" by Miranda Lambert is claimed to be the first country song inspired by Charles Bukowski to reach Number 1 on industry charts.
- A 2006 musical comedy, Bukowsical!, by Spencer Green and Gary Stockdale, pokes fun at Bukowski's life and hipster image.
- In 2026 the Detroit-area post-punk band Funderbird titled their first album and title track “Let It Kill You,” inspired by Bukowski’s “Find what you love and let it kill you.”
- Chuck Prophet mentions Bukowski in the first line of his 2020 song "High As Johnny Thunders" (from his album "The Land That Time Forgot").

=== In film ===
- Bukowski appeared with a cameo in the 1977 movie Supervan, as the "Wet T-Shirt Contest Water Boy."
- Tales of Ordinary Madness (Italian: Storie di ordinaria follia, French: Contes de la folie ordinaire), starring Ben Gazzara and Ornella Muti, is a 1981 film by Italian director Marco Ferreri, based on the 1972 collection Erections, Ejaculations, Exhibitions, and General Tales of Ordinary Madness.
- Barfly, released in 1987, is a semi-autobiographical film written by Bukowski and starring Mickey Rourke as Henry Chinaski, who represents Bukowski, and Faye Dunaway as his lover Wanda Wilcox. Sean Penn offered to play Chinaski for one dollar as long as his friend Dennis Hopper would direct, but the European director Barbet Schroeder had invested many years and thousands of dollars in the project and Bukowski felt Schroeder deserved to make it. Bukowski wrote the screenplay, was given script approval, and appears as a bar patron in a brief cameo.
- The 1991 French film Lune Froide, directed by Patrick Bouchitey, was entered into the 1991 Cannes Film Festival, and is based on the short stories "The Copulating Mermaid of Venice" and "Trouble with the Battery."
- The 2005 film Factotum, adapted from Bukowski's 1975 novel of the same name, was released to mixed reviews.
- In 2013, actor James Franco directed a film simply titled Bukowski, with Josh Peck playing the writer. Franco wrote the script with his brother Dave. The adaptation began shooting in Los Angeles on January 22, 2013, and was partially shot in Oxford Square, a historic neighborhood of Los Angeles. In April 2014, producer Cyril Humphris sued Franco, claiming that the film was an unauthorized adaptation of Bukowski's Ham on Rye, to which Humphris had the film rights. The lawsuit was eventually settled in October 2014. As of 2026, the film remains unreleased.
- The 2018 film Beautiful Boy, directed by Felix van Groeningen, features a scene where a recovering drug addict played by Timothée Chalamet reads part of Bukowski's poem "Let it Enfold You." The entirety of the poem is then read by Chalamet as a voice-over to the ending credits.

== Selected works ==
=== Novels ===
- 1971 – Post Office
- 1975 – Factotum
- 1978 – Women
- 1982 – Ham on Rye
- 1989 – Hollywood
- 1994 – Pulp

=== Poetry collections ===
- Flower, Fist, and Bestial Wail (1960)
- It Catches My Heart in Its Hands (1963) (title taken from Robinson Jeffers poem, "Hellenistics")
- Crucifix in a Deathhand (1965)
- At Terror Street and Agony Way (1968)
- Poems Written Before Jumping Out of an 8-story Window (1968)
- A Bukowski Sampler (1969)
- The Days Run Away Like Wild Horses Over the Hills (1969)
- Fire Station (1970)
- Mockingbird Wish Me Luck (1972)
- Burning in Water, Drowning in Flame: Selected Poems 1955–1973 (1974)
- Maybe Tomorrow (1977)
- Love Is a Dog from Hell (1977)
- Play the Piano Drunk Like a Percussion Instrument Until the Fingers Begin to Bleed a Bit (1979)
- Dangling in the Tournefortia (1981)
- War All the Time: Poems 1981–1984 (1984)
- You Get So Alone at Times That It Just Makes Sense (1986)
- The Roominghouse Madrigals (1988)
- Septuagenarian Stew: Stories & Poems (1990)
- People Poems (1991)
- The Last Night of the Earth Poems (1992)
- Betting on the Muse: Poems and Stories (1996)
- What Matters Most Is How Well You Walk Through the Fire. (1999)
- Open All Night (2000)
- The Night Torn Mad with Footsteps (2001)
- Sifting Through The Madness For The Word, The Line, The Way (2003)
- Slouching Toward Nirvana (2005)
- The Pleasures of the Damned: Selected Poems 1951–1993 (2007)
- “ The People Look Like Flowers at Last” (2007)
- The Continual Condition (2009)
- On Cats (2015)
- On Love (2016)
- Storm for the Living and the Dead (2017)

=== Short story chapbooks and collections ===
- Confessions of a Man Insane Enough to Live with Beasts (1965)
- Notes of a Dirty Old Man (1969)
- Erections, Ejaculations, Exhibitions, and General Tales of Ordinary Madness (1972)
- South of No North (1973)
- Hot Water Music (1983)
- Tales of Ordinary Madness (1983)
- The Most Beautiful Woman in Town (1983)
- Portions from a Wine-stained Notebook: Short Stories and Essays (2008)
- Absence of the Hero (2010)
- More Notes of a Dirty Old Man (2011)
- The Bell Tolls For No One (CityLights, 2015 edition)
- On Drinking (2019)

=== Nonfiction books ===
- Shakespeare Never Did This (1979); expanded (1995)
- The Captain Is Out to Lunch and the Sailors Have Taken Over the Ship (1998)
- On Writing; Edited by Abel Debritto (2015)
- The Mathematics of the Breath and the Way: On Writers and Writing; Edited by David Stephen Calonne (City Lights, 2018)

== See also ==
- Charles Bukowski's influence on popular culture
- Bukowski (1973 film)
