= Erections, Ejaculations, Exhibitions, and General Tales of Ordinary Madness =

1972 book by Charles Bukowski

- Author: Charles Bukowski
- Language: English
- Genre: Short comedic Short Stories
- Publisher: City Lights Publishers
- Publication date: 1972
- Publication place: United States
- Media type: Print (paperback)
- ISBN: 0-87286-061-2

Erections, Ejaculations, Exhibitions, and General Tales of Ordinary Madness was a paperback collection of short stories by Charles Bukowski, first published by City Lights Publishers in 1972. It was the first collection of Bukowski's stories to be published, and it was republished in two volumes in 1983, as Tales of Ordinary Madness and The Most Beautiful Woman in Town.

Lawrence Ferlinghetti, the owner of City Lights Publishers, was one of the first to recognize Bukowski as a short-story writer. He published the collection, which was dedicated to Bukowski's girlfriend, the poet and sculptor Linda King. The stories originally appeared in the underground newspapers Berkeley Barb and Open City, men's magazines including Adam, and in literary reviews, including Nova Express.
