= Charles Potts =

American counter-culture poet (born 1943)

Charles Potts (born August 28, 1943) is an American counter-culture poet. He is sometimes referred to as a projectivist poet and was mentored by Edward Dorn. Raised in rural Mackay, Idaho, Potts left Pocatello, Idaho and Idaho State University in the mid '60s and set out for Seattle, Mexico, and ultimately the location where he rose to literary prominence: the countercultural hotbed of Berkeley, California.

There, he founded the Litmus literary magazine and the Litmus publishing company, which published his friend Charles Bukowski's book Poems written before jumping out of an 8 story window. Potts gives an account of his time as a revolutionary hippie in the Berkeley poetry scene, and a psychotic breakdown he suffered there, in his two-part memoir Valga Krusa.

In the '80s Potts moved to Walla Walla, Washington where he later founded The Temple bookstore, Tsunami Publishing, and The Temple Literary Magazine.

Tsunami Inc. issued books by Stephen Thomas (Journeyman, 1997), klipschutz (Twilight of the Male Ego, 2002), and others. Potts in effect “rediscovered” klipschutz (pen name of Kurt Lipschutz), whom he had featured in seven out of 20 issues of his quarterly, The Temple Literary Magazine.

Potts's biography is also of record in the Marquis publications, Who's Who in America, 1977, Who's Who in the West, 1996, Who's Who in the World, 1996, and Who's Who in Finance and Industry, 1998.

Potts, better known as a poet, also won Manuscript's International's First Place Novel Award for Creative Excellence in 1991, for the Novel Loading Las Vegas. He was given a Distinguished Professional Achievement Award by the Alumni Association and the College of Arts and Sciences at Idaho State University in 1994. He has a Lifetime Achievement Award from the Washington Poets Association in 2008.

Also a singer/songwriter, Potts tapes and CDs recorded at Studio 13 in Salt Lake City and Bayside Audio in Austin, Texas, which is home to the Charles Potts Magic Windmill Band (named for him but in which he does not play) circulate underground. Various YouTube videos of his recordings were made by Bill Anderson.

A political and economic geographer, How the South Finally Won the Civil War: And Controls the Political Future of the United States, published in 1995, got a boost in recognition when the Harvard educated and Boston College professor of history, Heather Cox Richardson, published a similarly titled book, How the South Won the Civil War, with Oxford University Press in 2020.

Potts’s most recent book in The Fifth Convulsion: The Structure of American History.

Potts's collected works, letters, and publishing materials were housed in the archives of Utah State University's Merrill-Cazier Library in Logan, Utah in 2011.

== Bibliography ==
Books:

- Coyote Highway, Least Bittern Books, Henry County, Kentucky, 2016
- Pilgrim & Martel, Least Bittern Books, Henry County, Kentucky, 2015
- The Source, Green Panda Press, Cleveland Heights, Ohio, 2014
- Inside Idaho, Poems 1996-2007, West End Press, Albuquerque, New Mexico, 2009
- The Yellow Christ, Valga Krusa Vol. 1, Green Panda Press, Cleveland Heights, Ohio, 2007
- Laffing Water, Valga Krusa, vol. 2, Green Panda Press, Cleveland Heights, Ohio, 2007
- The Portable Potts, West End Press, Albuquerque, New Mexico, 2005
- Kiot: Selected Early Poems, 1963–1977, Blue Begonia Press, Yakima, Washington, 2005
- Compostrella/Starfield, Time Barn Books, Nashville, Tennessee, 2004
- Across the North Pacific, Slough Press, College Station, Texas, 2002
- Lucintite TM, Butcher Shop Press, Oneonta, New York 2002
- Slash and Burn, Blue Begonia Press, with Robert McNeally, Yakima, Washington, 2001
- Prophet/Profit, Poetnoise, with Chris Bodor, Beacon, New York, 2001
- Nature Lovers, Pleasure Boat Studio, Bainbridge Island, Washington, 2000
- Angio Gram, D Press, Sebastopol, California, 2000
- Little Lord Shiva: The Berkeley Poems, 1968, Glass Eye Books, Northampton, Massachusetts, 1999
- Lost River Mountain, Blue Begonia Press, Yakima, Washington, 1999
- Fascist Haikus, Acid Press, Pocatello, Idaho, 1999
- 100 Years in Idaho, Tsunami Inc., Walla Walla, Washington, 1996
- How the South Finally Won the Civil War, Tsunami Inc., 1995
- Loading Las Vegas, Current, Walla Walla, Washington, 1991
- The Dictatorship of the Environment, Druid Books, Milwaukee, Wisconsin, 1991
- A Rite to the Body, Ghost Dance Press, East Lansing, Michigan, 1989
- Rocky Mountain Man, (Selected Poems) The Smith, New York City, 1978
- Valga Krusa, Litmus Inc., Salt Lake City, Utah, 1977
- The Opium Must Go Thru, Litmus Inc., with illustrations by Robert McNeally, 1976
- Charlie Kiot, Folk Frog Press, Salt Lake City, Utah, 1976
- The Golden Calf, Litmus Inc., Salt Lake City, Utah, 1975
- The Trancemigraçion of Menzu, Empty Elevator Shaft Press, San Francisco, 1973
- Waiting in Blood, Rainbow Resin Press, Salt Lake City, Utah, 1973
- Blue up the Nile, Quixote, Madison, Wisconsin, 1972
- The Litmus Papers, Gunrunner Press, Milwaukee, Wisconsin, 1969
- Little Lord Shiva, Noh Directions, Berkeley, California, 1969
- Burning Snake, Presna De Lagar, Portland, Oregon, 1967
- Blues From Thurston County, Grande Ronde Press, La Grande, Oregon, 1966
