= I Don't Think I Can Do This Anymore =

Studio album by Moose Blood
- Released: 9 March 2018
- Genre: Emo
- Length: 36:42
- Label: Hopeless
- Producer: Beau Burchell

Moose Blood chronology
Blush (2016)	I Don't Think I Can Do This Anymore (2018)

Singles from I Don't Think I Can Do This Anymore
- 1. "Have I Told You Enough" Released: 12 February 2018

I Don't Think I Can Do This Anymore is the third and final studio album by British emo band Moose Blood. The album was released on 9 March 2018. It was followed by a tour of the UK and Northern America.

== Reception ==
Professional ratings
Aggregate scores
Source	Rating
Metacritic	65/100
Review scores
Source	Rating
AllMusic	3/5 stars
Sputnikmusic	2.3/5

I Don't Think I Can Do This Anymore received mixed to positive reviews from critics upon release. On Metacritic, the album holds a score of 65/100 based on 5 reviews, indicating "generally favorable reviews".

== Track listing ==
No.	Title	Writer(s)	Length
1.	"Have I Told You Enough"	Eddy Brewerton; Mark Osborne	4:28
2.	"Talk in Your Sleep"	Brewerton; Osborne	3:46
3.	"Just Outside"	Brewerton; Osborne	2:35
4.	"You Left in the Worst Way"	Brewerton; Osborne	2:05
5.	"All the Time"	Brewerton; Osborne	3:04
6.	"Can We Stay Like This"	Brewerton; Osborne	3:45
7.	"Pull Me from the Floor"	Brewerton; Osborne	3:29
8.	"Walk All Day with You"	Brewerton; Osborne	2:57
9.	"Such a Shame"	Brewerton; Osborne	3:21
10.	"Promise Me"	Brewerton; Osborne	3:15
11.	"It's Too Much"	Brewerton; Osborne	3:57
Total length:			36:42

== Charts ==
Chart (2018)	Peak position
Scottish Albums (OCC)	31
UK Albums (OCC)	32
