= Open City (newspaper) =

Newspaper published in Los Angeles, US

- Cover of the Oct. 11-17, 1967, issue of Open City
- Type: Weekly newspaper
- Format: Broadsheet/Alternative newspaper
- Founder: John Bryan
- Publisher: John Bryan
- Editor-in-chief: John Bryan
- Staff writers: Charles Bukowski
- Founded: May 6, 1967; 59 years ago in Los Angeles
- Ceased publication: April 1, 1969; 57 years ago
- Political alignment: Radical
- Headquarters: Los Angeles, California, U.S.
- Circulation: 35,000

Open City was a weekly underground newspaper published in Los Angeles by avant-garde journalist John Bryan from May 6, 1967 to April 1969. It was noted for its coverage of radical politics, rock music, psychedelic culture and the "Notes of a Dirty Old Man" column by Charles Bukowski.

== History ==
Bryan was a journalist who quit the San Francisco Chronicle in 1964 to found the brief-lived San Francisco bohemian tabloid weekly Open City Press, publishing 15 issues from Nov. 18, 1964 to March 17–23, 1965. Open City Press was a local forerunner of the Berkeley Barb, providing coverage of the Free Speech Movement.

After closure of Open City Press Bryan relocated to Southern California. After a stint working for Art Kunkin as managing editor of the Los Angeles Free Press, he launched Open City in Los Angeles, starting the volume numbering with vol. 2, no. 1 (May 5–11, 1967). At its peak Open City circulated 35,000 copies. Unlike almost all other underground papers which were published in tabloid newspaper format, Open City was printed in the larger broadsheet-sized format. It published some of Charles Bukowski's earliest professionally published prose in his regular column "Notes of a Dirty Old Man," which appeared in all but a few issues.

In March 1968 Bryan was prosecuted on an obscenity charge for printing an image of a nude woman in a record company advertisement for Leon Russell. Six months later, in September 1968, there was a second obscenity bust over the short story "Skinny Dynamite" by Jack Micheline, about the sexual antics of an underage girl, in a literary supplement to Open City edited by Charles Bukowski. The cost of Bryan's legal defense and a $1,000 fine on the first charge eventually put the shoestring operation out of business. (Bukowski's "Notes of a Dirty Old Man" was subsequently taken on by the Los Angeles Free Press.)

Bukowski published a satirical and somewhat cruel fictional account of Open City in Evergreen Review under the title "The Birth, Life and Death of an Underground Newspaper."

John Bryan's follow-up to Open City was the ambitious but brief-lived Sunday Paper, which published six or seven issues in San Francisco in February and March 1972. Published in the large broadsheet format, each issue was fronted by a two-page section of underground comics edited by Willy Murphy and printed in full color.

== See also ==
- San Francisco Oracle
- Summer of Love
- List of underground newspapers of the 1960s counterculture
