= John Wilson McCracken =

British artist

John Wilson McCracken (1936–1982) was a British artist and poet who made portraits of residents of Hartlepool. McCracken's paintings are held in collections such as Arts Council England and Hartlepool Art Gallery.

His work has been exhibited alongside other 20th-century British artists, such as L. S. Lowry, Margaret Green and John Bratby in the 2021 exhibition Hartlepool Unlocked.

McCracken's work is used in the context of mental health awareness. In 2024, the Hartlepool Art Gallery launched a mental health initiative for men that used his paintings to 'inspire and support' participants. In 2026, his work was included in the national exhibition The Weight of Being at Two Temple Place in London. Writing for Our Culture, Gerda Krivaite noted that the paintings reflected a "sensitivity to the emotional and social pressures of his time".

== Early life ==
Born in Belfast, McCracken moved to Birmingham at age 9. He attended the Slade School of Fine Art in London from 1956 to 1959. While in London, McCracken became acquainted with artists such as Lucian Freud and Francis Bacon, through his attendance at The Colony Room Club in Soho.

== Career ==
In 1959, McCracken moved to Hartlepool, where he studied and subsequently taught at West Hartlepool College of Art. From 1962 to 1973, he worked as a technician at the Gray Art Gallery and Museum.

During his time at the Hartlepool Art Gallery, McCracken was involved in bringing works and exhibitions to Hartlepool, and “was instrumental in acquiring several important contemporary works of art for the town’s collection”. In 1972, he arranged for a London exhibition by Lucian Freud to be shown in Hartlepool, Freud's first solo exhibition outside London. The same year, he was involved in the museum's acquisition of Frank Auerbach's painting Shell Building Site.

His artistic style was described as influenced by Francis Bacon, particularly in his depictions of the human form. Writing about McCracken's exhibition in Bede Gallery in 1973, critic William Feaver noted the influence of Freud on McCracken's work, but said "there is a good deal more to McCracken’s work. For a start, it’s obviously the product of acute, painstaking observation."

McCracken was active in Hartlepool's arts scene during the 1960s, organising poetry and jazz nights. His work influenced many local artists. He continued to create art despite experiencing health issues, and died aged 46.

McCracken took part in group exhibitions and symposia as part of The Front Group alongside Patrick Heron, Ian Lang and Alan Turner, such as the Bowes Museum Art Centre in March 1966. In a review of the exhibition published by The Guardian in 1966, art critic William Ernest Johnson noted how his work had "all the intensity of Lucian Freud".
