= Hot Water Music (short story collection) =

1983 short story collection by Charles Bukowski

- First edition
- Author: Charles Bukowski
- Language: English
- Publisher: Black Sparrow Press
- Publication date: 1983
- ISBN: 0-87685-596-6 (first edition, paperback)
- Dewey Decimal: 813.54
- LC Class: PS3552.U4 H6

Hot Water Music is a collection of short stories by Charles Bukowski, published in 1983 by Black Sparrow Press. The collection deals largely with drinking, women, gambling, and writing. It is an important collection that establishes Bukowski's minimalist style and his thematic oeuvre.

The punk rock band Hot Water Music is named after the collection.

== Contents ==
- Less Delicate than the Locust
- Scream When You Burn
- A Couple of Gigolos
- The Great Poet
- You Kissed Lily
- Hot Lady
- It's a Dirty World
- 900 Pounds
- Decline and Fall
- Have You Read Pirandello?
- Strokes to Nowhere
- Some Mother
- Scum Grief
- Not Quite Bernadette
- Some Hangover
- A Working Day
- The Man Who Loved Elevators
- Head Job
- Turkeyneck Morning
- In and Out and Over
- I love you Albert
- White Dog Hunch
- Long Distance Drunk
- How To Get Published
- Spider
- The Death of the Father I
- The Death of the Father II
- Harry Ann Landers
- Beer at the Corner Bar
- The Upward Bird
- Cold Night
- A Favor for Don
- Praying Mantis
- Broken Merchandise
- Home Run
- Fooling Marie
