= Girls Against =

Non-profit organisation

- Formation: 2015
- Founder: Hannah Camilleri, Anni Cameron, Anna Cowan, Ava Cadenhead, Bea Bennister
- Website: www.girlsagainst.co.uk

The Girls Against is a non-profit organisation formed in 2015 by Hannah Camilleri and four friends, Anni Cameron, Anna Cowan, Ava Cadenhead and Bea Bennister. Camilleri's experience of sexual assault at a Peace gig in Glasgow in 2015 prompted the young women to set up Girls Against to shine a spotlight on sexual assault of young women at gigs, and support victims in sharing and recovering from their experiences.

== History ==
By 2016, Girls Against had over 80 international representatives actively promoting the campaign by communicating with the press, venues and bands themselves.

In March 2020, Girls Against were featured on the BBC in an interview with Isy Suttie for We Can Change the World.

== Support and media coverage ==
They have been supported by many bands and artists, including Peace, Slaves, Wolf Alice Circa Waves, and The Zangwills and have been featured by Time Out, NME, Dr Martens and Skinnydip London.
