= I'll Keep You in Mind, From Time to Time =

I'll Keep You in Mind, from Time to Time

Studio album by Moose Blood
- Released: 7 October 2014
- Recorded: April 2014
- Studio: The Cottage, Los Angeles, California; Hurley Studios, Costa Mesa, California
- Genre: Emo, pop punk, indie rock
- Length: 35:26
- Label: No Sleep
- Producer: Beau Burchell

Moose Blood chronology
Moving Home (2013)	I'll Keep You in Mind, from Time to Time (2014)	Blush (2016)

I'll Keep You in Mind, from Time to Time is the debut studio album by British emo band Moose Blood.

== Background and recording ==
Moose Blood formed in 2012. The group's line-up consisted of Eddy Brewerton on vocals and guitar, Mark E. Osbourne on guitar, Kyle Todd on bass and Glen Harvey on drums. After honing their musical skills in hardcore bands Burn Down Rome and Harbours, the group aimed for more singing and melody in their music. In November 2013, the band released a split with Departures through independent label No Sleep. On 16 April 2014, it was announced that the band had signed to No Sleep and would release their debut album later in the year. No Sleep founder Chris Hansen became aware of Moose Blood due to Departures, "and it was love at first listen".

Recording for their debut album began in April 2014, and took place at The Cottage in Los Angeles, California and Hurley Studios in Costa Mesa, California. Beau Burchell handled producer duties, as well as engineering and mixing, with assistance from Davey Warsop. "Boston" and "Bukowski" were re-recorded during the recording sessions. Bill Henderson mastered the recordings at Azimuth Mastering.

== Composition ==
I'll Keep You in Mind, from Time to Time is, according to Harvey, "everything that we've been working towards since the start of the band in 2012." According to Osbourne, the album features songs "about my dad, his dad, our girlfriends, wives ... We put everything into writing a record that is so personal." Alternative Press writer Griffin Elliot wrote that "Cherry" was about "a conflicted young man wrestling with his love of being a father while yearning for all the chances he missed." According to Brewerton, "Anyway" is about his mum: "I wanted to write a song to show her how much she means to me."

"Gum" was one of the first songs the band had written for the album. According to Brewerton, the track "came together really easily". He wrote the lyrics to it when he was "getting to know my wife and all the little things that happened in those first few weeks." Early on in the writing process, Brewerton wanted to write "something" about his dad. He ended up writing "Pups" in one afternoon. Most of the lyrics for the song are in-jokes that only Brewerton and his dad would understand. The name of track nine, "Bukowski", is a reference to writer Charles Bukowski.

== Release ==
On 2 July 2014, I'll Keep You in Mind, from Time to Time was announced for release, and the album's artwork and track listing was revealed. On the same day, "Anyway" was made available for streaming. On 16 July, the band released a behind the scenes video of them recording the album. On 19 August, a music video was released for "Swim Down". According to Brewerton, the band were offered "some amazing tours that were too good to say no to", and as a result all of the members quit their jobs to focus on touring in September and October. I'll Keep You in Mind, from Time to Time was made available for streaming on 2 October, before being released on 7 October through No Sleep. To celebrate its release, the band performed album release shows in Leeds and London. A day later, a music video was released for "I Hope You're Missing Me". Following this, the band went a tour of Europe. In November, the band supported Mallory Knox on their tour of the UK.

In January 2015, the band went on their first headlining tour, touring across the UK with support from Choir Vandals and Boston Manor. On 15 January, a music video was released for "Bukowski", directed by Bethan Miller. The video was filmed during the band's tour with Mallory Knox. In February, the band supported Fightstar on their tour of the UK. In March, the band went on a tour of the UK with Creeper. In April and May, the band supported Man Overboard on their tour of the UK. On 19 May, a music video was released for "Gum". Between mid-June and early August, the band went on the 2015 edition of Warped Tour. They performed on the Journeys Left Foot Stage; Brewerton also performed at the Acoustic Basement Stage. In August and September, the band went on the Mates Club tour in the UK with support from Creeper. During this tour, the band performed I'll Keep You in Mind, from Time to Time in its entirety. In December, the band supported Lower Than Atlantis on their tour of the UK.

== Reception ==
Professional ratings
Aggregate scores
Source	Rating
Metacritic	77/100
Review scores
Source	Rating
AbsolutePunk	7/10
Alternative Press	4/5 stars
PopMatters	6/10 stars
Punknews.org	4/5 stars
Rock Sound	8/10
The Signpost	3/5

The album was included at number 9 on Rock Sound's "Top 50 Albums of the Year" list.

== Track listing ==
No.	Title	Length
1.	"Cherry"	2:40
2.	"Anyway"	3:11
3.	"I Hope You're Missing Me"	3:24
4.	"Chin Up"	3:33
5.	"Boston"	2:32
6.	"Gum"	3:01
7.	"Pups"	3:21
8.	"Swim Down"	3:18
9.	"Bukowski"	3:16
10.	"Kelly Kapowski"	2:54
11.	"I Hope You're Miserable"	4:19

== Personnel ==
Personnel per booklet.

Moose Blood

- Eddy Brewerton – lead vocals, rhythm guitar
- Mark E. Osborne – lead guitar, backing vocals
- Glenn Harvey – drums
- Kyle Todd – bass

Production

- Beau Burchell – producer, mixing, engineer, programming
- Davey Warsop – assistant engineer
- Bill Henderson – mastering
- Sam DeSantis – photography
- Empty Design Coalition – layout, design

== Chart performance ==
Chart (2014)	Peak position
US Billboard Heatseekers Albums	45
