= Blush (Moose Blood album) =

Studio album by Moose Blood
- Released: 5 August 2016
- Recorded: November–December 2015
- Studio: The Cottage, Los Angeles, California
- Genre: Emo, pop punk, indie rock
- Length: 35:29
- Label: Hopeless, No Sleep
- Producer: Beau Burchell

Moose Blood chronology
I'll Keep You in Mind, From Time to Time (2014)	Blush (2016)	I Don't Think I Can Do This Anymore (2018)

Singles from Blush
- 1. "Knuckles" Released: 31 January 2017

Blush is the second studio album by British emo band Moose Blood. It is their last release to feature drummer Glenn Harvey before his departure in 2017.

== Background and recording ==
In April 2014, Moose Blood signed to independent label No Sleep. According to vocalist/guitarist Eddy Brewerton, the band were offered "some amazing tours that were too good to say no to", and as a result all of the members quit their jobs to focus on touring in September and October. While still touring that October, the band released their debut album, I'll Keep You in Mind, From Time to Time. Subsequent touring helped the band members become aware of their strengths and weaknesses, as guitarist Mark E. Osbourne explains: "[Touring] just made us play better together ... and as a unit, we’re just tighter through playing and touring so much." In July 2015, Brewerton mentioned that the group was "throwing some ideas about" and was planning to "sit down and start properly writing" following appearances at the Reading and Leeds Festivals.

Prior to recording, the band sent demos to producer Beau Burchell, who had produced their debut album, to give him a rough idea of the band's future direction. Recording for Blush began in November 2015 at The Cottage, located in Los Angeles, California. While in the studio, Burchell pushed the group to create an album that would top their debut. Burchell also handled recording and mixing. Acoustic versions of "Honey" and "Sway" were recorded at The Clubhouse with Ricky Beetlestone. In early December, the band announced they had finished recording. Mastering took place at Azimuth Mastering.

== Composition ==
Osborne and Brewerton would write material together before showing it to the rest of the band during practice sessions. From there, they would turn it into a full-band song. The band faced pressure while writing Blush. Brewerton explained: "we started thinking about that [the pressure of writing a follow-up] too much. We just tried to do everything the best we could ... and worked harder on the songs." A few of the album's songs were written prior to recording; most of them were written as the recording process was underway, which allowed the band to be more creative.

The group spent more time crafting the songs according to Brewerton, instead of simply "sticking some ideas together and settling with that". Touring was a major influence during writing, according to Osbourne: "because you spend time away from the people important to you." While some of songs on band's debut album dealt with Brewerton meeting his wife, some of the songs on Blush were about "being away from family." The group wanted to include "proper choruses this time", something they thought was lacking on I'll Keep You in Mind, From Time to Time.

According to Brewerton, "Pastel" follows on from their debut album's opening track "Cherry". "Cherry" is about getting engaged, whereas "Pastel" "comes around and I’m actually married". According to Osborne, the lyrics for "Honey" were inspired by a girl that was "messing me around while being on tour." "Knuckles" is about when Brewerton met his wife and knowing that "you have found someone who is perfect for you straightaway." "Sway" came about from a jam session; Brewerton went outside to smoke and heard the rest of the band playing the song. He was initially annoyed according to Osbourne, saying he wasn't going to play guitar on the song. Brewerton explained: "Only 'cause it sounded great without me!"

== Release ==
On 1 April 2016, the band released a teaser video, hinting that their next album would be released in the summer. On 14 April, the band announced they had signed to Hopeless Records. Four days later, Blush was announced for release, and the album's artwork and track listing was revealed. On the same day, a music video was released for "Honey", directed by Lewis Cater. Mischa Pearlman of TeamRock called it "a parody video which features an updated (and presumably English) version of a typical American nuclear family." Also in April, the band went on a tour of the UK with The Winter Passing and Greywind. Following a premier on BBC Radio 1, "Knuckles" was made available for streaming on 2 June. A week later, a music video was released for the song, directed by Cater. In July, the band went on a headlining tour of the US. On 21 July, "Sulk" was made available for streaming. On 2 August, "Cheek" was made available for streaming.

Blush was released on 5 August through Hopeless and No Sleep. The HMV edition included "Loome" and acoustic versions of "Honey" and "Sway" as bonus tracks. Shortly afterwards, the band performed a series of intimate shows in the UK. Later in August, the band went on a tour of Australia. On 13 September, acoustic versions of "Glow" and "Knuckles" were released as joint single under the name Stay Beautiful. From mid-September to early October, the band went on a tour of Europe with Pup and Luca Brasi. Following this, the band went on a tour of the UK with Boston Manor and Turnover. From mid October to late November, the band supported The Wonder Years on their tour of the US. On 24 October, a music video was released for "Cheek". The video was filmed at The Studio at Webster Hall in New York City. In January and February 2017, the band supported A Day to Remember on their tour of the UK and Europe.

On 31 January 2017, "Knuckles" was released to US modern rock radio stations. In February and March, the band toured across the US with support from Trophy Eyes, Boston Manor and A Will Away.

== Reception ==
Professional ratings
Review scores
Source	Rating
AllMusic	3.5/5 stars
idobi	10/10
Kerrang!	4/5
Punknews.org	4.5/5 stars
Rock Sound	9/10
Stereoboard	3/5 stars
Upset	5/5 stars

Blush received mostly positive reviews from critics. In a positive review Neil Yeung of AllMusic said that "everything here hits harder — both in terms of musicianship and sentiment — providing a fine balance of anthems and raw confessionals".

Rock Sound ranked the album at number 6 on their top releases of 2016 list. Alternative Press included the album on their 30 best albums of 2016 list.

== Track listing ==
No.	Title	Length
1.	"Pastel"	3:11
2.	"Honey"	3:28
3.	"Knuckles"	3:45
4.	"Sulk"	3:10
5.	"Glow"	3:38
6.	"Cheek"	3:50
7.	"Sway"	3:12
8.	"Shimmer"	3:42
9.	"Spring"	3:14
10.	"Freckle"	4:19

Bonus tracks

HMV bonus tracks
No.	Title	Length
11.	"Loome"	3:16
12.	"Honey" (acoustic)	3:22
13.	"Sway" (acoustic)	2:54

== Personnel ==
Personnel per booklet.

Moose Blood

- Eddy Brewerton – vocals, guitar
- Mark E. Osborne – guitar
- Kyle Todd – bass
- Glenn Harvey – drums

Production

- Beau Burchell – producer, recording, mixing
- Nicole Busch – photography
- Glenn Harvey – artwork, layout

== Charts ==
Chart (2016)	Peak position
Scottish Albums (OCC)	13
UK Albums (OCC)	10
US Billboard 200	175
US Billboard Vinyl Albums	3
