= Portions from a Wine-stained Notebook: Short Stories and Essays =

Book by Charles Bukowski

Portions From a Wine-Stained Notebook
- Author: Charles Bukowski
- Language: English
- Publisher: City Lights
- Publication date: September 2008
- Pages: 300
- ISBN: 978-0-87286-496-2

Portions From a Wine-Stained Notebook is written by Charles Bukowski, edited by David Stephen Calonne, and published by City Lights.

== Table of Contents ==
- Aftermath of a Lengthy Rejection Slip
- 20 Tanks From Kasseldown
- Hard Without Music
- Trace: Editors Write
- Portions From a Wine-Stained Notebook
- A Rambling Essay on Poetics and the Bleeding Life Written While Drinking a Six-Pack (Tall)
- In Defense of a Certain Type of Poetry, a Certain Type of Life, a Certain Type of Blood-Filled Creature Who will Someday Die
- Artaud Anthology
- An Old Drunk Who Ran Out of Luck
- Notes of a Dirty Old Man
- Untitled Essay in A Tribute to Jim Lowell
- Notes of a Dirty Old Man
- The Night Nobody Believed I was Allen Ginsberg
- Should We Burn Uncle Sam's Ass?
- The Silver Christ of Santa Fe
- Dirty Old Man Confesses
- Reading and Breeding for Kenneth
- The L.A. Scene
- Notes on the Life of an Aged Poet
- Upon the Mathematics of the Breath and the Way
- Notes of a Dirty Old Man
- Notes of a Dirty Old Man
- Notes of a Dirty Old Man
- Unpublished Foreword to William Wantling's 7 on Style
- Jaggernaut
- Picking the Horses
- Workout
- The Way it Happened
- Just Passing Time
- Distractions in the Literary Life
- I Meet the Master
- Charles Bukowski's Los Angeles for Li Po
- Looking Back at a Big One
- Another Portfolio
- The Other
- Basic Training
