= The Sick Bag Song =

Book

- First edition
- Author: Nick Cave
- Language: English
- Genre: Non-fiction; Poetry
- Publisher: Canongate
- Publication date: 2015

The Sick Bag Song is a book of non-fiction and poetry by Nick Cave, released in 2015.

The book was announced in March 2015. Cave handwrote the book on airplane sick bags while on tour in North America in 2014. The book is divided into 22 sections, one for each city he visited.
