= Moving Home =

EP by Moose Blood
- Released: 11 February 2013
- Recorded: Emo, Indie Rock, Pop punk
- Length: 14:54
- Label: Fist in the Air
- Producer: Ricky Beetlestone

Moose Blood chronology
Bukowski Demo (Summer '12) (2012)	Moving Home (2013)	I'll Keep You in Mind, From Time to Time (2014)

Professional ratings
Review scores
Source	Rating
Absolute Punk	8.5/10 stars
Punknews.org	4/5 stars
Sputnikmusic	3.5/5 stars

Moving Home is the debut release from English band Moose Blood. It was released on Fist in the Air Records in February 2013.

== Track listing ==
All music is composed by Moose Blood

No.	Title	Length
1.	"My Own Boat"	1:02
2.	"Evening Coffee"	2:35
3.	"Moving Home"	3:01
4.	"Carbis Bay"	2:40
5.	"Drive"	2:19
6.	"Bukowski"	3:21
Total length:		14:54

== Personnel ==
Adapted via Bandcamp.

Moose Blood
- Eddy Brewerton – vocals, guitar
- Mark E. Osborne – guitar
- Sam Bradford – bass
- Glenn Harvey – drums
