= Moose Blood =

English emo band

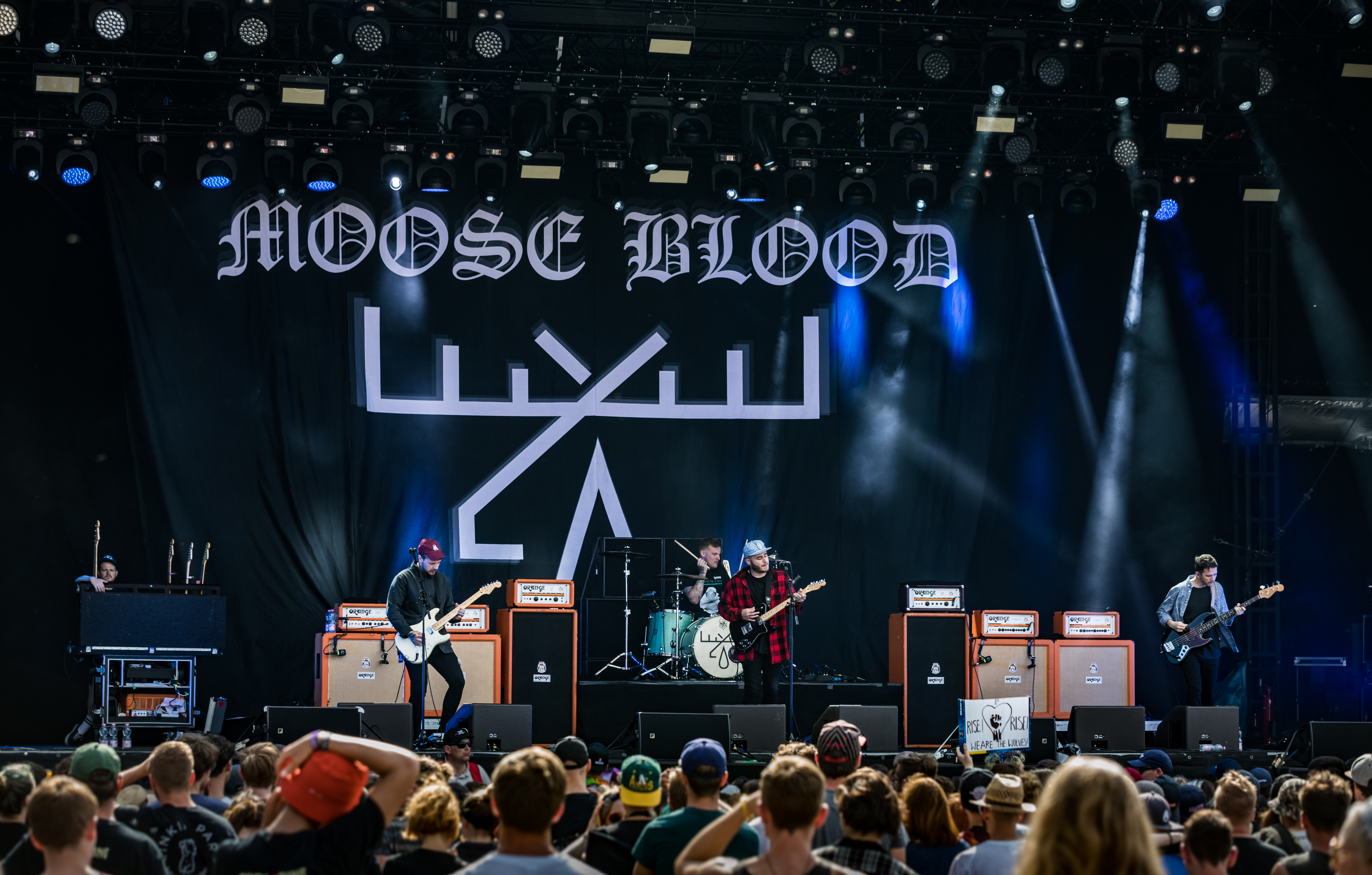
- Moose Blood live at Rock am Ring 2018

Background information
- Origin: Canterbury, Kent, England
- Genres: Emo; pop-punk; emo pop; punk rock
- Years active: 2012–2018; 2024
- Labels: Fist in the Air; Venn; No Sleep; Hopeless
- Members: Eddy Brewerton; Mark E. Osborne; Kyle Todd; Lee Munday
- Past members: Sam Bradford; Glenn Harvey

Moose Blood were an English emo band based in Canterbury, Kent. They formed in 2012 and were previously signed to Hopeless Records.

The band released three albums from 2012 to 2018. Moose Blood went on a six-year hiatus before returning in 2024 to celebrate the 10th anniversary of their debut.

== History ==
Moose Blood formed in August 2012 and published a self-released demo, Bukowski Demo (Summer '12), in the same month. The group's line-up consisted of Eddy Brewerton on vocals and guitar, Mark E. Osbourne on guitar, Kyle Todd on bass and Glenn Harvey on drums. On 11 February 2013, an EP, Moving Home, was released through Fist in the Air. "Boston" and "Orlando" were released together as a single through Venn Records on 26 April. The band released a split EP with Departures through No Sleep on 12 November. On 16 April 2014, it was announced that the band had signed to No Sleep and would release their debut album later in the year. In May, the band supported I Am the Avalanche on their tour of the UK. Their debut album I'll Keep You in Mind, From Time to Time charted at number 45 on the US Billboard Top Heatseekers chart. They played on the 2015 Warped Tour.

Moose Blood announced in January 2016 that they would be touring the UK throughout April 2016, supported by The Winter Passing and Greywind. The tour - which would include headline shows at venues such as the O2 Academy Islington in London, and Joiners in Southampton - ended up selling out before it had begun. Moose Blood announced, via their Facebook and Twitter accounts, on 13 April that they had signed to Hopeless Records for their second album. On 17 April that the first single titled "Honey" was played on the Radio 1 Rock Show as the Rockest Record. Eddy also announced that the new album would be released on 5 August and would be titled Blush.

In March 2017, Moose Blood announced the departure of drummer Glenn Harvey in the wake of sexual harassment allegations. Harvey was alleged to have sent an unsolicited image to a woman during 2015. In addition, frontman Eddy Brewerton was also accused of stealing nude photographs from a woman's phone and sharing them with the band, which he denied.

In March 2018, the anti-sexual assault non-profit organisation Girls Against ended its partnership with England's Truck Festival over their refusal to remove Moose Blood from their lineup over the sexual misconduct allegations.

In April 2018, Movements dropped off a tour supporting Moose Blood over the band's sexual misconduct allegations. On 24 September 2018, Moose Blood was announced as support for Good Charlotte's headline tour across Europe and the UK, but Good Charlotte removed them hours later after fan backlash over Moose Blood's sexual misconduct allegations. Following their removal from the Good Charlotte tour, Moose Blood announced a hiatus, citing that "it has been a traumatic past year."

On 3 May 2021, Mark Osborne and Lee Munday announced a new band Hurtless that also features Brian MacDonald from PVRIS. Lee's Instagram post included the caption "Moving on...", hinting at a full break up for Moose Blood. The next month, Hurtless released their debut single "Slower".

On 15 January 2024, Moose Blood announced a one-off show to commemorate the 10th anniversary of I'll Keep You in Mind, From Time to Time, set to take place on 8 June 2024 at Camden Underworld in London. Tickets were released on 19 January 2024 and, after selling out within seconds, a second show was announced, taking place on 7 June 2024.

== Musical style ==
Moose Blood has been described as emo, pop punk and emo pop. Alex DiVincenzo described their 2013 EP Moving Home as "like a combination of Brand New's Deja Entendu, The Get Up Kids' Something to Write Home About and American Football's self-titled."

They cited influences including Tigers Jaw, Dashboard Confessional, Nirvana, Jimmy Eat World, American Football and Brand New.

== Band members ==
=== Final lineup ===
- Eddy Brewerton – vocals, rhythm guitar (2012–2018, 2024)
- Mark E. Osbourne – lead guitar, vocals (2012–2018, 2024)
- Kyle Todd – bass (2013–2018, 2024)
- Lee Munday – drums (2017–2018, 2024)

=== Former ===
- Glenn Harvey – drums (2012–2017)
- Sam Bradford – bass (2012–2013)

== Discography ==
=== Studio albums ===
- I'll Keep You in Mind, From Time to Time (2014)
- Blush (2016)
- I Don't Think I Can Do This Anymore (2018)

=== Compilation appearances ===
- "I Don't Love You" (2016)
  - My Chemical Romance cover on Rock Sound Presents: The Black Parade album

== Awards ==
=== Kerrang! Awards ===
Year	Nominee / work	Award	Result
2016	"Honey"	Best Track	Nominated
