= David Stephen Calonne =

American writer and scholar

David Stephen Calonne (born August 15, 1953) is an American writer and scholar of the Beat Generation and Charles Bukowski. He was born in Los Angeles, where he attended the University of California.

== Impact ==
His work has been cited in many other distinguished works, such as Revision: History, Theory, and Practice by Alice S. Horning and Anne Becker, which discusses Calonne's investigation of how revision correlates to the psychology of creativity. His book William Saroyan: My real work is being has been influential in Michael Bobelian's book on the Armenian Genocide, Children of Armenia.

== Works ==
- The Mathematics of the Breath and the Way (editor for Charles Bukowski, City Lights, 2018) ISBN 9780872867598
- The Spiritual Imagination of the Beats (Cambridge University, 2017) ISBN 9781108238830
- Henry Miller (Reaktion Books, 2014)
- Charles Bukowski (Reaktion Books, 2012)
- More Notes of a Dirty Old Man (editor for Charles Bukowski, City Lights, 2011) ISBN 9780872865433
- William Saroyan, My Real Work is Being (1983) ISBN 9780807815656
