= Robert Veverka =

Czech politician (born 1976)

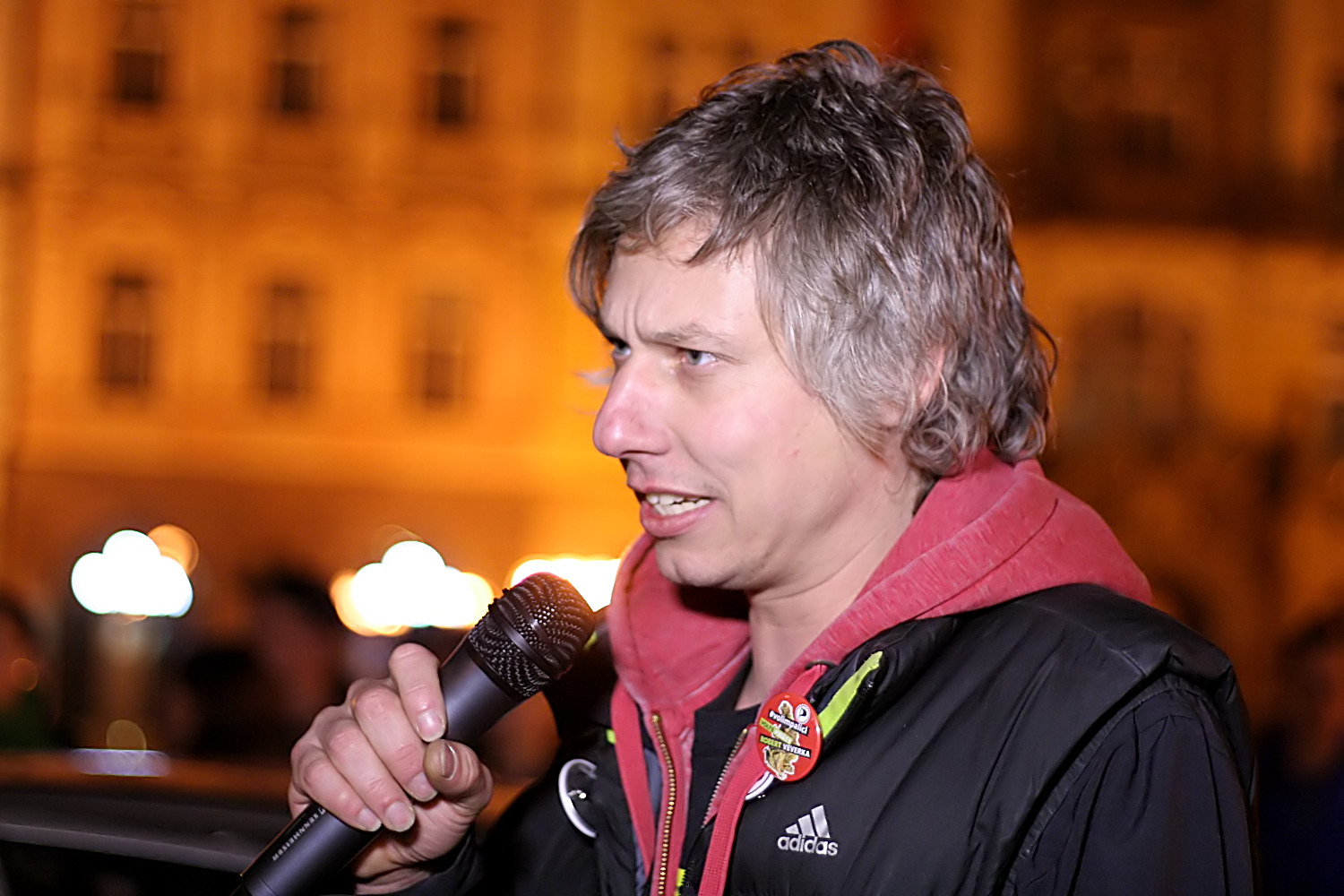
- Born: 18 November 1976 (age 49); Prague, Czechoslovakia
- Occupations: politician, activist, editor, publisher
- Political party: Independent
- Website: robertveverka.cz

Robert Veverka (born 18 November 1976) is a Czech municipal politician and activist. He is a representative of district Prague 2, a member of the Prague 2 Safety Commission, and a cannabis legalization activist. He has been repeatedly elected to the Prague 2 council as an independent candidate with the support of the Czech Pirate Party. From 2010 to 2022, he was editor-in-chief of the magazine Legalizace (Legalization), which was ironically declared "illegal" and was forced to cease publication in a high-profile freedom of the press case.

== Life ==
Veverka was born on 18 November 1976 in Prague. He graduated from grammar school in Prague and afterwards from a business academy in 1995. He then worked as an independent contractor in IT. He spent time abroad from 1999 to 2007 in the United States, the Netherlands, and Australia.

=== Legalizace.cz ===
In 2010, Veverka became chairperson of the voluntary association Legalizace.cz, which focuses on initiatives to end cannabis prohibition and legislate the legalization of cannabis in the Czech Republic. The same year, he also started publishing the bi-monthly magazine Legalizace, of which he is also editor-in-chief. Since 2018, he has also been an associatte editor of the bi-monthly magazine Konopí (English version: Cannabis Therapy) vydávaném od roku 2018, který se zabývá fenoménem konopí pro léčebné účely. Working for Legalizace.cz, he also organizes Prague's Million Marihuana March, which has been taking place annually in May since 2000.

=== Political engagement ===
Robert Veverka ran as in independent with an agenda of cannabis legalization under the umbrella of the Czech Pirate Party for parliamentary elections in 2013 and 2017, but was not elected. In the 2018 Czech municipal elections, he was elected to the Prague 2 district town hall. He was also chosen as a member of the Prague 2 Safety Council. He was also accepted to the Trade Centre Praha Board of Trustees. Veverka took part in writing a bill prepared by the Czech Pirate Party to legalize home growing of cannabis for private use, introduced in the Czech Parliament in August 2018.

In June 2020 he announced his candidacy for the autumn senate elections from district no. 27 – Prague 1 with the support of the Czech Pirate Party. He won 9.18% of the votes, ending up in third place.

== "Toxicomania" Trial / Freedom of the Press ==
In 2021, Veverka was taken to Bruntál District Court as publisher and editor-in-chief of Legalizace, for "spreading toxicomania", i.e. spreading drug addiction, through the information in its pages. Veverka's lawyer argued that the magazine's articles are for information purposes only and his client was protected by the freedom of the press. Veverka lost the case, the magazine was fined, and he personally was convicted of the offense and given probation. On appeal, the conviction was overturned in 2023, but the magazine fine remained in place, and Veverka was given a substantial personal fine as well.

This is not the first time a Czech publisher has been taken to court and found guilty of "spreading toxicomania": a similar case took place in Olomouc District Court in 1996, which found the publisher Votobia guilty for publishing a Czech translation of the cookbook Cooking with Cannabis by Adam Gottlieb. That decision was appealed but upheld in the Olomouc Regional Court in 1997. President Václav Havel pardoned the publisher in 1998. No such pardon has been given Veverka.

== Rational Regulation (Racionální regulace) ==
Veverka is one of the founding members of "Racionální regulace", a Czech NGO focussed on cannabis decriminalization.
