= Notes of a Dirty Old Man =

Collection of writings by Charles Bukowski

- First edition cover
- Author: Charles Bukowski
- Publication date: 1969

Notes of a Dirty Old Man (1969) is a collection of underground newspaper columns written by Charles Bukowski. Bukowski's popular weekly column by the same name appeared in newspapers including Open City, Los Angeles Free Press, NOLA Express, and High Times.

Bukowski's columns were collated and published by Essex House in 1969. His short articles were marked by his trademark crude humor, as well as his attempts to present a "truthful" or objective viewpoint of various events in his life and his own subjective responses to those events. The series is published by City Lights Publishing Company but can also be found in Portions from a Wine-Stained Notebook, which is a collection of some of Bukowski's rare and obscure works.

== Plot summary ==
Bukowski uses his own life as the basis for his series of articles, and characteristically leaves nothing out. The different stories range from hooking up with the wife of a stranger who invites him over for dinner to admire his work, to Bukowski's versions of "debates" with other writers at "Open City". Bukowski goes through life and each event without caring about the consequences of his actions. He is almost always alone aside from the occasional prostitute that he invites over. A few times, generous people who admire his writings will allow him to stay with them rent free, though he does not understand why people enjoy his writings so much. As soon as he starts to get too close to these families or hosts he will leave without notice and go on to find a new place to stay. However, he does mention that he does not want readers to feel sorry for him, which is why he includes crude comedy along with each story. He always has some type of alcohol with him that allows him to be as carefree as he is. Whether he is drinking while writing his stories and poetry, or showing up to work and meetings already drunk, every story incorporates his vigorous drinking habits.

== A Dirty Old Man Confesses ==
Along with the series Notes of a Dirty Old Man, Portions from a Wine-Stained Notebook includes another deep look into Charles Bukowski's life. It is a lengthened version of Notes of a Dirty Old Man that is more of an autobiography about him becoming a writer than a short story. It is called A Dirty Old Man Confesses. This short autobiography places Notes of a Dirty Old Man into a clearer timeline, providing the reader with a better perspective of Bukowski's life. It is a more personal and serious way for readers and fans to get to know more about the author and how he lived. It begins during his early childhood by explaining the difficult relationship that he had with his father.

His father whipped him for the slightest reasons whenever he got the chance. Bukowski became numb from the pain and began isolating himself from everyone around him, even other children at school. Eventually he was able to move out on his own and began entering drinking and gambling contests because he found he was very good at it. He began his cycle of getting kicked out and moving into different homes and hotels (which is elaborated more on in Notes of a Dirty Old Man). His life would go downhill fast until his writing career became slightly successful and then go downhill again. His work was published in Story and in other magazines, in addition to the column he wrote for the underground newspaper, installments of which were eventually compiled and published by Essex House. Between each success he would work unfulfilling jobs, drink more than usual, and take advantage of the generosity of anyone offering it.
