= The Most Beautiful Woman in Town =

Short story collection by Charles Bukowski

The Most Beautiful Woman in Town & Other stories
- First edition cover
- Author: Charles Bukowski
- Language: English
- Genre: Short story collection
- Publisher: City Lights Books
- Publication date: 1983
- Media type: Print (paperback)
- Pages: 240 pp
- ISBN: 0-87286-156-2
- OCLC: 10071524
- Dewey Decimal: 813/.54 19
- LC Class: PS3552.U4 M66 1983

The Most Beautiful Woman in Town & Other Stories is a collection of anecdotal short stories by American author Charles Bukowski. The stories are written in both the first and third-person, in Bukowski's trademark semi-autobiographical short prose style. In keeping with his other works, themes include: Los Angeles bar culture; alcoholism; gambling; sex and violence. However, many of the stories contain elements of fantasy and surrealism. The book was initially printed as Erections, Ejaculations, Exhibitions, and General Tales of Ordinary Madness. The stories originally appeared in Open City, Nola Express, Knight, Adam, Adam Reader, Pix, The Berkeley Barb and Evergreen Review.

== Contents ==
- Kid Stardust on the Porterhouse
- Life in a Texas Whorehouse
- Six Inches
- The Fuck Machine
- The Gut-Wringing Machine
- 3 Women
- 3 Chickens
- Ten Jack-Offs
- Twelve Flying Monkeys Who Won't Copulate Properly
- 25 Bums in Rags
- Non-Horseshit Horse Advice
- Another Horse Story
- The Birth, Life and Death of an Underground Newspaper
- Life and Death in the Charity Ward
- The Day We Talked About James Thurber
- All the Great Writers
- The Copulating Mermaid of Venice, Calif
- Trouble with a Battery
- (swastika symbol)
- Politics is like Trying to Screw a Cat in the Ass
- My Big-Assed Mother
- A Lovely Love Affair
- All the Pussy We Want
- The Beginner
- The Fiend
- The Murder of Ramon Vasquez
- A Drinking Partner
- The White Beard
- A White Pussy

== Trivia ==
- In the film The Rules of Attraction the book can be seen in the drawer of Sean Bateman's room.
