= George H. Nash =

American historian (born 1945)

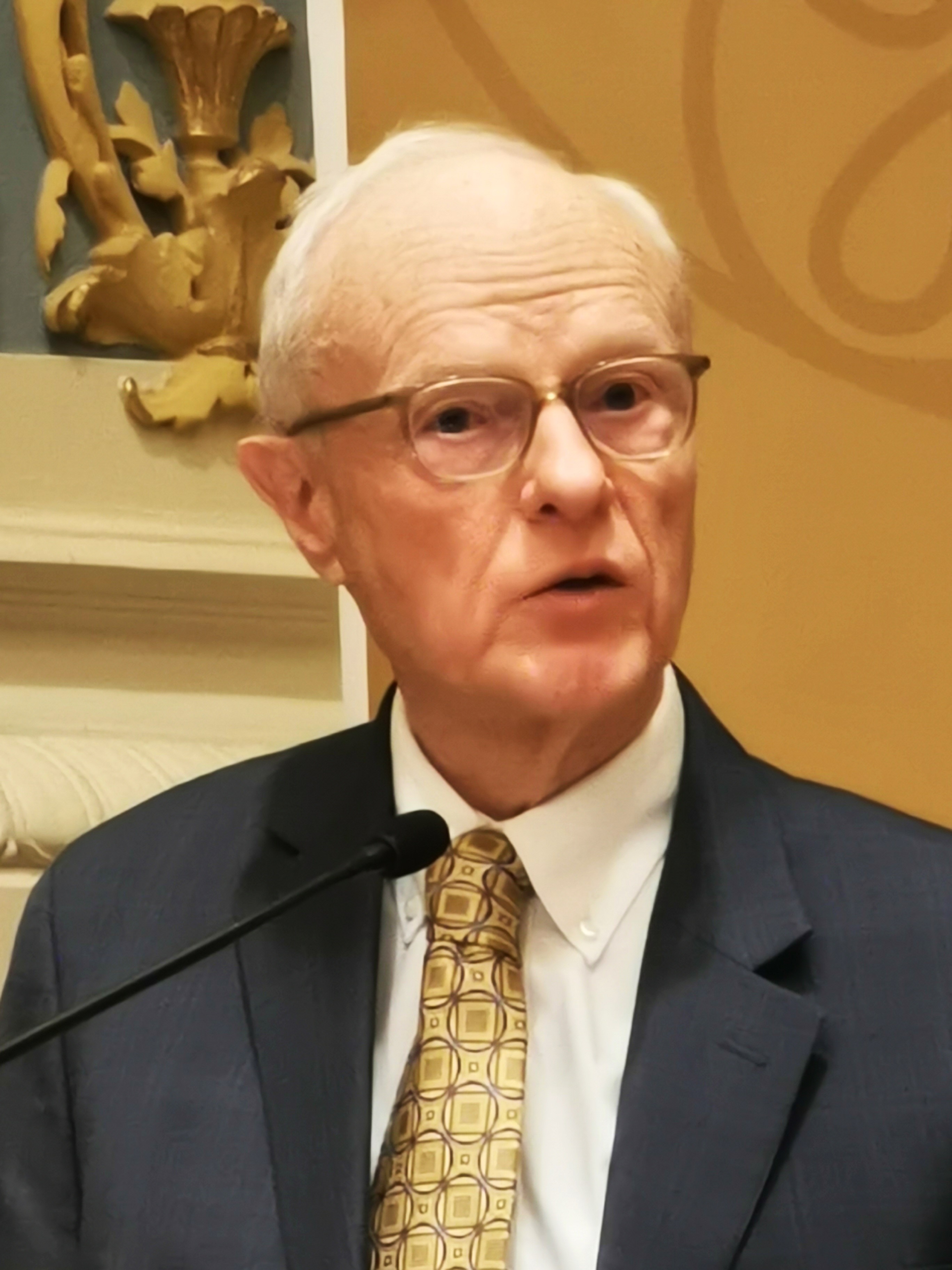
- Born: April 1, 1945 (age 81)
- Education: Amherst College; Harvard University
- Occupation: Historian

George H. Nash (born April 1, 1945) is an American historian and interpreter of American conservatism. He is a biographer of Herbert Hoover. He is best known for The Conservative Intellectual Movement in America Since 1945, which first appeared in 1976 and has been twice revised and expanded.

== Career ==
Nash graduated from Amherst College in 1967 and received his Ph.D. in History from Harvard University in 1973. He is an independent scholar who lectures and consults widely. From 1975 to 1995, he lived in Iowa to work at the Herbert Hoover Presidential Library, where he wrote three volumes of a definitive, scholarly biography, ending in 1918, commissioned by the Herbert Hoover Presidential Library Association. He researched in hundreds of manuscript collections and archival sources in the United States, Canada, Europe, and Australia. Nash published numerous essays on Hoover. Most recently, he edited and wrote a long introduction to Freedom Betrayed: Herbert Hoover's Secret History of the Second World War and Its Aftermath (2011).

Nash's essays have appeared in the American Spectator, Claremont Review of Books, Intercollegiate Review, Modern, National Review, The New York Times Book Review, Policy Review, University Bookman, The Wall Street Journal, and other periodicals. He has lectured at the Library of Congress; the National Archives; the Herbert Hoover, John F. Kennedy, and Lyndon Johnson presidential libraries; the Gerald R. Ford Presidential Museum; the Hoover Institution; the Heritage Foundation; the McConnell Center; and various universities and conferences in the United States and Europe.

== Conservatism ==
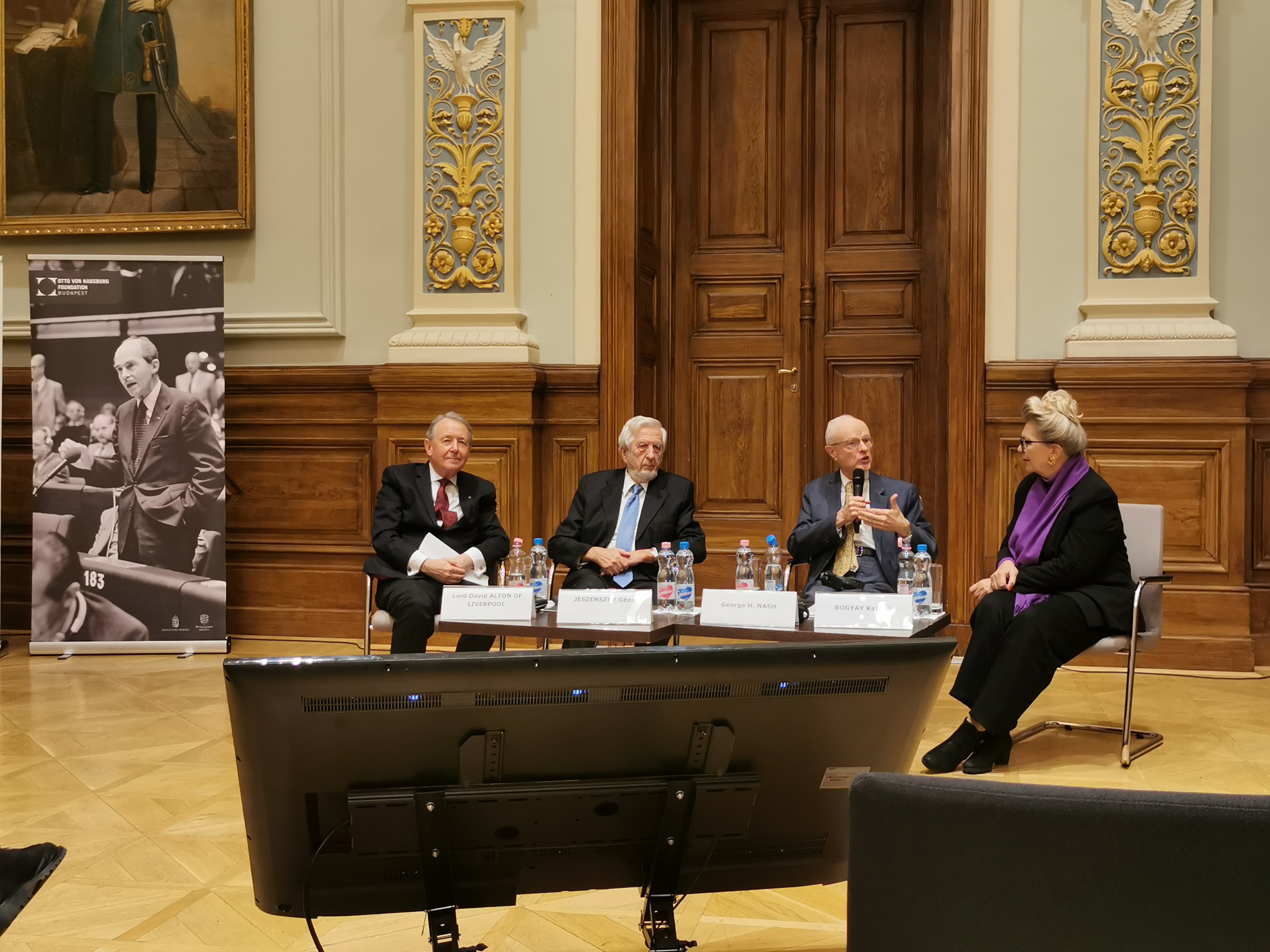
Churchill 150: George H. Nash, Géza Jeszenszky, Lord David Alton, and Katalin Bogyay

In 2019, Nash said, "I would describe myself as a fusionist with a traditionalist tilt", referring to the conservatism promoted by Frank Meyer (1909–1972) in the National Review magazine. He accepts capitalism and the individual liberty it requires but believes that liberty is not enough, and he stresses the importance of religion and the pursuit of personal virtue, as argued by the conservative traditionalists. In mid-2019, Nash evaluated the Trump presidency as having "shattered the fusionist consensus within conservatism".

Nash argues that Trump has shattered the fusionist consensus within conservatism. On every front, Nash claims, Trump has challenged or subverted the conservative orthodoxy. He has abandoned the doctrine of free trade in favor of protectionism. He pays lip service to traditionalist concerns, and he pursues pro-life policies, but his past positions and personal conduct clash with social-conservative sensibilities. He has called into question the merits of the NATO alliance, sounding, when he does, like an isolationist. For Nash, Trump is in many ways an aberration from, rather than a fulfilment of, the ideas of the conservative intellectual movement.

== Awards and honors ==
From 1987 to 1990, Nash served on the National Commission on Libraries and Information Science (NCLIS), a federal agency. He has served on the editorial advisory board of Modern Age and is a Senior Fellow at the Russell Kirk Center for Cultural Renewal. Since 2004, he has been an Associate of the Hauenstein Center for Presidential Studies at Grand Valley State University. From 2006 to 2008, he served as president of the Philadelphia Society. In 2008, he was the recipient of the annual Richard M. Weaver Prize for Scholarly Letters, created by the Ingersoll Foundation. In 2014, he joined the National Advisory Board of the Calvin Coolidge Presidential Foundation.

== Evaluations ==
Historian Jennifer Burns, evaluating The Conservative Intellectual Movement in America Since 1945, concluded in 2004:

It is a rare work of history that remains the authoritative treatment of its subject nearly thirty years after publication, cited by numerous contemporary historians for its content and scholarship rather than as an historiographical curio ... Nash's book, based on his Harvard dissertation, has become literally the first and last word on the topic ... [It] achieved this dominance because he was the first historian to cast aside the stale interpretive legacies of the 1950s ...Today, his work exerts a deep influence on our common understanding of conservatism in America, an influence that is deserved but nonetheless in need of critical appraisal.

Examining conservative intellectual history, Kim Phillips-Fein writes in 2011:

The most influential synthesis of the subject remains George H. Nash's The Conservative Intellectual Tradition since 1945, first published in 1976. Nash sought to counter the condescension of the consensus scholars who assumed that conservatives had no serious intellectual life. He argued that postwar conservatism brought together three powerful and partially contradictory intellectual currents that previously had largely been independent of each other: libertarianism, traditionalism, and anticommunism. Each particular strain of thought had predecessors earlier in the twentieth (and even nineteenth) centuries, but they were joined in their distinctive postwar formulation through the leadership of William F. Buckley Jr. and National Review. The fusion of these different, competing, and not easily reconciled schools of thought led to the creation, Nash argued, of a coherent modern Right."

Phillips-Fein concludes, "There is, as yet, no work of intellectual history that challenges Nash's synthesis, and it is difficult to overstate the impact that it still has on the field." Historian Ellis W. Hawley, evaluating the first volume of the Hoover biography in the American Historical Review, says that Nash's descriptive detail ranges from "rich and fascinating" to "excessive and tedious". Hawley concludes: "Throughout, the quality of the scholarship, the sifting and use of evidence, the imaginative reconstruction of relevant historical contexts, and the ability to communicate all deserve high marks." Historian Stanley Shapiro calls the third volume "definitive", saying it belongs to "a special class of scholarly achievements: meticulous in archival research, richly detailed, magisterial in its command of the domestic and international politics of the war period, and always patient and even-handed in judging men and events."

== Publications ==
External videos
- George H. Nash, Ph.D, discusses research at the Hoover Presidential Library (December 9, 2014)

=== Articles ===
- "Forgotten Godfathers: Premature Jewish Conservatives and the Rise of National Review." American Jewish History, vol. 87, no. 2/3 (June/September 1999), pp. 123–157.

=== Books ===
- From Radicalism to Revolution: The Political Career of Josiah Quincy (1970)
- The Conservative Intellectual Movement in America Since 1945 (1976)
- The Life of Herbert Hoover: The Engineer 1874–1914 (Life of Herbert Hoover, vol. 1) (1983)
- The Life of Herbert Hoover: The Humanitarian, 1914–1917 (Life of Herbert Hoover, vol. 2) (1988) excerpt and text search
- Herbert Hoover and Stanford University (1988)
- The Life of Herbert Hoover: Master of Emergencies, 1917–1918 (Life of Herbert Hoover, Vol. 3) (1996) excerpt and text search
- Books and the Founding Fathers. Library of Congress: Center for the Book (2007)
- Reappraising the Right: The Past and Future of American Conservatism (2009) excerpt and text search

== Editor ==
- Co-editor, Province in Rebellion: History of the Founding of the Commonwealth of Massachusetts, 1774–1775. Harvard University Press (1975)
- Hoover, Herbert. Freedom Betrayed: Herbert Hoover's Secret History of the Second World War and Its Aftermath (Hoover Institution Press (2011) ISBN 978-0817912345.
- Hoover, Herbert. The Crusade Years, 1933–1955: Herbert Hoover's Lost Memoir of the New Deal Era and Its Aftermath. Hoover Institution Press (2013). ISBN 0817916741.
