= Margaret Hoover =

American political commentator (born 1977)

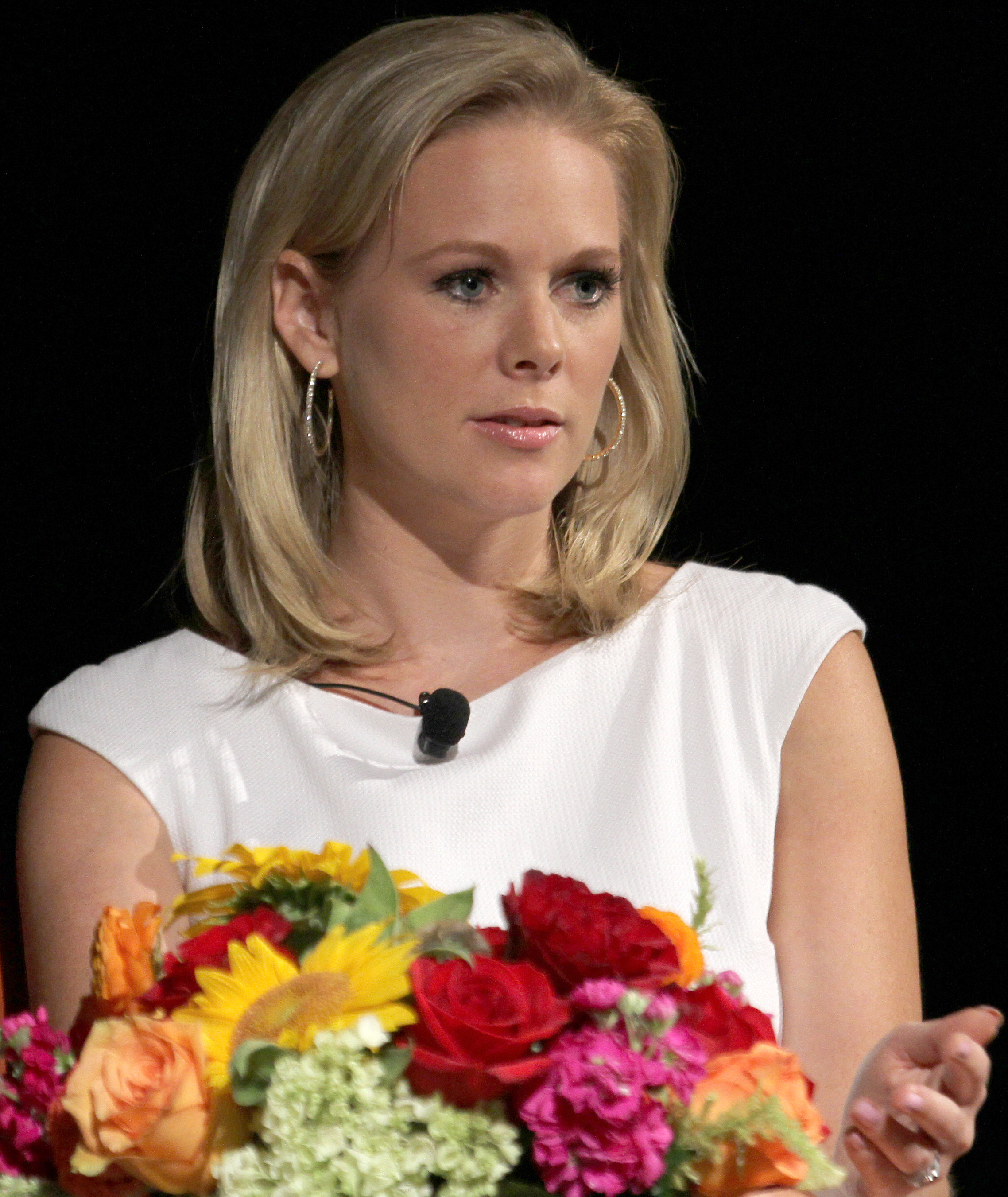
- Hoover in 2011
- Born: Margaret Claire Hoover; December 11, 1977 (age 48); Pittsburgh, Pennsylvania, U.S.
- Education: Davidson College (attended); Bryn Mawr College (BA)
- Political party: Republican
- Spouse: John Avlon (m. 2009)
- Children: 2
- Family: Allan Hoover (grandfather); Herbert Hoover (great-grandfather); Lou Henry Hoover (great-grandmother)

Margaret Claire Hoover (born December 11, 1977) is an American political commentator, political strategist, journalist, media personality, author, and great-granddaughter of Herbert Hoover, the 31st U.S. president. She hosts PBS's reboot of the conservative interview show Firing Line.

== Early life ==
Margaret Hoover was born in Pittsburgh and raised in Colorado, the daughter of Jean (née Williams), a flight attendant, and Andrew Hoover, a mining engineer. She is the great-granddaughter of U.S. President Herbert Hoover (1929–1933) through her father, Andrew Hoover, and her grandfather, Allan Hoover.

Hoover received primary education at Graland Country Day School, an independent co-educational day school in Denver. She earned a B.A. in Spanish literature with a minor in political science from Bryn Mawr College in 2001. She also attended Davidson College for two years, but did not earn a degree there. Along the way, Hoover studied Spanish-language literature and Mandarin Chinese. She also studied abroad in Bolivia, Mexico and China.

After graduating from college, Hoover moved to Taipei where she was hired as a research assistant and editor at a Taiwanese law firm. She arrived on the day of the September 11 attacks. Quickly realizing she wanted to be back in the U.S., she returned home in 2002.

== Career ==
=== Public service ===
Hoover worked for the George W. Bush administration as associate director of Intergovernmental Affairs. She worked on Bush's 2004 reelection campaign and was Deputy Finance Director for Rudy Giuliani's presidential bid in 2006–07. She served as deputy press secretary for Congressman Mario Díaz-Balart and as senior advisor to the Deputy Secretary of the Department of Homeland Security. Hoover is on the board of overseers at Stanford University's Hoover Institution, and on the boards of the Herbert Hoover Presidential Foundation and Freedom House. She served on the advisory council of The American Foundation for Equal Rights and GOProud.

=== LGBTQ equality advocacy ===
Hoover has been an advocate for same-sex marriage and LGBTQ rights, arguing that marriage equality is consistent with conservative principles of individual freedom and limited government. She has stated that she personally advocated for the passage of same-sex marriage legislation in New York, where Republican legislators provided key votes for the state's 2011 marriage equality law.

In 2012, Hoover traveled to Minnesota to support Minnesotans United for All Families, the campaign opposing a proposed constitutional amendment that would have banned same-sex marriage. The Minnesota Star Tribune reported that Hoover came to the Twin Cities during the final days of the campaign in an effort to help reach Republican voters.

In addition to her public advocacy, Hoover supported marriage-equality efforts through the American Unity Fund, a Republican-led advocacy organization. In 2013, the group contributed funding to the successful campaign to legalize same-sex marriage in Hawaii.

Hoover has been described as part of efforts to advance LGBTQ equality within the Republican Party and has argued that support for LGBTQ rights is consistent with conservative principles of individual freedom. Some social conservatives criticized Hoover's efforts to broaden Republican support for same-sex marriage. In a 2011 opinion column, commentator Maggie Gallagher associated Hoover with a group of Republicans whom she characterized as seeking to move the party away from traditional positions on social issues.

=== Political beliefs ===
Hoover is a Republican with libertarian beliefs on social issues. Hoover is an advocate for gay rights, including gay marriage, arguing that individual freedom and marriage are conservative values.

The Advocate profiled Hoover in 2011 as a prominent Republican supporter of marriage equality, describing her as one of the few conservative commentators willing to openly advocate for same-sex marriage and LGBTQ rights.

In 2013, Hoover was among a group of Republican political strategists, donors, and policy advocates who signed an amicus curiae brief submitted to the Supreme Court in support of same-sex marriage in Hollingsworth v. Perry. In a contemporaneous interview with The New York Times, Hoover argued that support for marriage equality was consistent with conservative principles of individual freedom, stating that "if we are the party of individual freedom, we should be consistently the party of individual freedom" and that government "shouldn't restrain those freedoms." Hoover argued that support for marriage equality was consistent with both conservative principles of individual liberty and a "big tent" Republican Party that could accommodate differing views on social issues.

Hoover has been a critic of Donald Trump. Before the 2020 election, she described the presidential contest as a "binary choice" and stated, "I can't bring myself to vote for Donald Trump," adding that she would "quite likely" cast her vote for Joe Biden. In a 2023 interview, Hoover described Trump as presenting a "unique threat to the country" and criticized what she characterized as his authoritarian tendencies and degradation of political discourse.

=== Political commentator ===
In 2011, Hoover published American Individualism: How a New Generation of Conservatives Can Save the Republican Party, published by Crown Forum.

From 2008 to 2012, Hoover was a Fox News contributor, appearing on Bill O'Reilly's The O'Reilly Factor. In the branded segment "Culture Warrior", she jousted with O'Reilly on a range of topics from entertainment news to popular culture to Hollywood and politics. In 2012, she became a political contributor at CNN.

In 2014, Hoover hosted the Toyota Solutions Studio at Tina Brown's Women in the World summit at Lincoln Center, conducting interviews with panelists and participants on issues including maternal health, women's entrepreneurship, and countering violent extremism.

In April 2018, PBS announced that Hoover would host a revival of Firing Line, the long-running public affairs program originally hosted by William F. Buckley Jr.

=== Firing Line with Margaret Hoover (PBS TV Series) ===
Hoover hosts Firing Line with Margaret Hoover, a revival of William F. Buckley Jr.'s public-affairs television program Firing Line. The original show aired on PBS for 33 years, the longest-running public affairs show in television history with a single host.

Hoover's show premiered on June 2, 2018, on WNET, which serves the New York metropolitan area, and is the largest PBS market in the country.

Hoover has said that the revived series was intended to encourage longer-form political discussion and expose viewers to a range of perspectives. In a 2018 interview with Parade, she described Firing Line as an "antidote to the times we're in," arguing that contemporary political media often relies on "talking points" rather than substantive discussion and that the program would seek to "explore the nuance" of public affairs issues. PBS president and chief executive officer Paula Kerger cited Firing Line with Margaret Hoover as an example of the network's public-affairs programming, stating that the series "creates a forum for people with a wide range of views to respectfully share ideas."

The New York Times wrote, "Under Ms. Hoover's direction, the discourse is civil and substantive".

National Review columnist Kevin D. Williamson wrote that the revival of Firing Line came at "an interesting time, and a needful one," describing the program as an opportunity for more substantive political discourse.

In the run-up to the show's premiere, Politico Magazine described the revival as an experiment aimed at testing whether audiences were interested in more substantive and less confrontational political discussion.

In May 2019, The Algemeiner named Hoover its Journalist of the Year for her work on Firing Line.

== Personal life ==
Hoover is married to journalist and political commentator John Avlon, a former speechwriter for Rudy Giuliani, former editor-in-chief of The Daily Beast, and Democratic nominee for New York's 1st congressional district in 2024. They have a son, born in 2013 and a daughter, born in 2015.

== Selected works ==
- Hoover, Margaret (July 2011). American Individualism: How a New Generation of Conservatives Can Save the Republican Party (Hardbound ed.). New York: Crown Forum. ISBN 978-0307718150.

== See also ==
- New Yorkers in journalism
