= Herbert Hoover Jr. =

American politician (1903–1969)

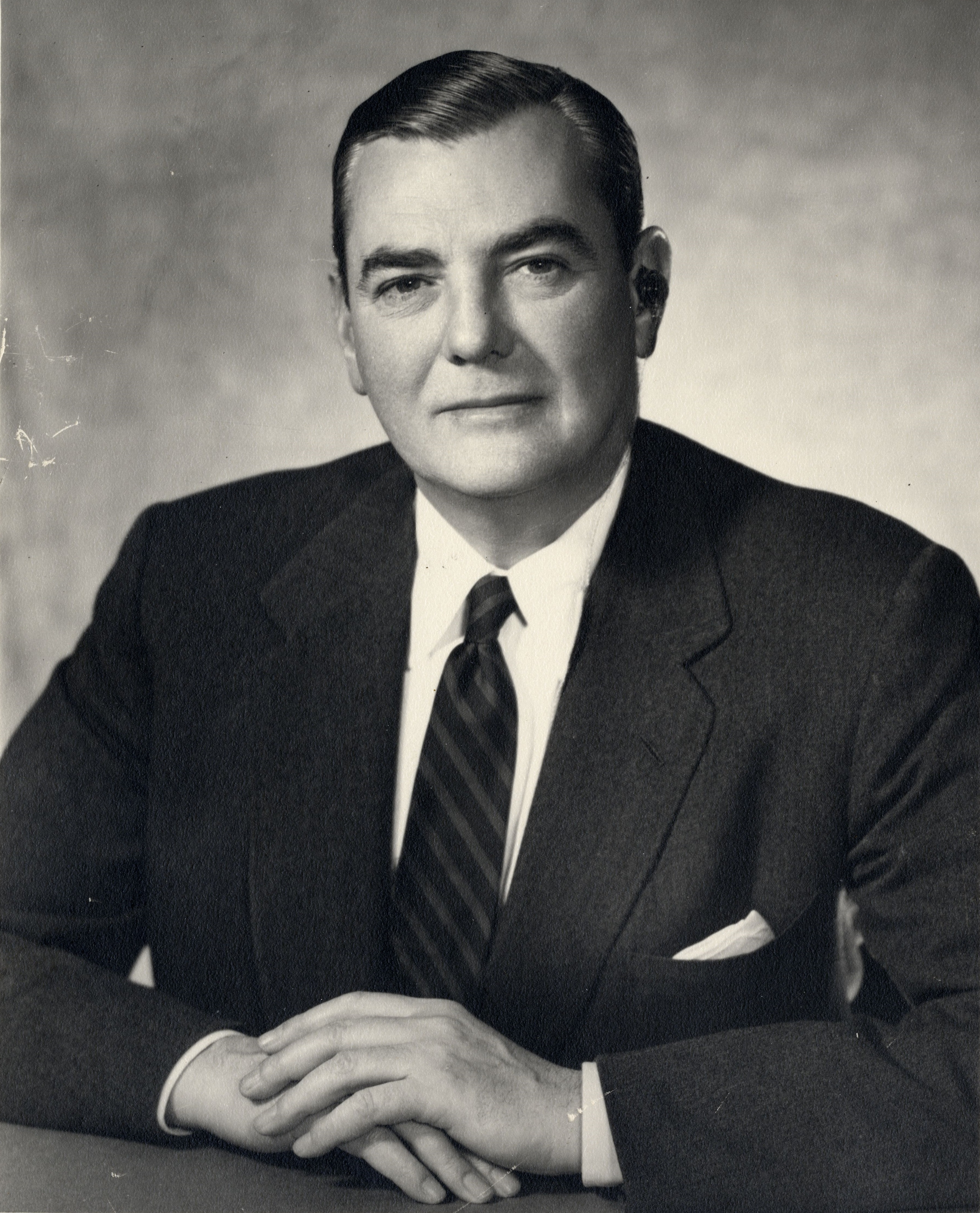

19th United States Under Secretary of State
- In office October 4, 1954 – February 5, 1957
- President: Dwight D. Eisenhower
- Preceded by: Walter B. Smith
- Succeeded by: Christian Herter

Personal details
- Born: Herbert Charles Hoover; August 4, 1903 London, England
- Died: July 9, 1969 (aged 65) Pasadena, California, United States
- Party: Republican
- Spouse: Margaret Eva Watson (m. 1925)
- Children: 3
- Parents: Herbert Clark Hoover (father); Lou Henry Hoover (mother)
- Relatives: Allan Hoover (brother)
- Education: Stanford University (BS); Harvard University (MBA)

Herbert Charles Hoover (August 4, 1903 – July 9, 1969), better known as Herbert Hoover Jr., was a British-born American engineer, businessman, and politician who served as United States Under Secretary of State from 1954 to 1957. He was the elder son of President Herbert Hoover.

== Biography ==
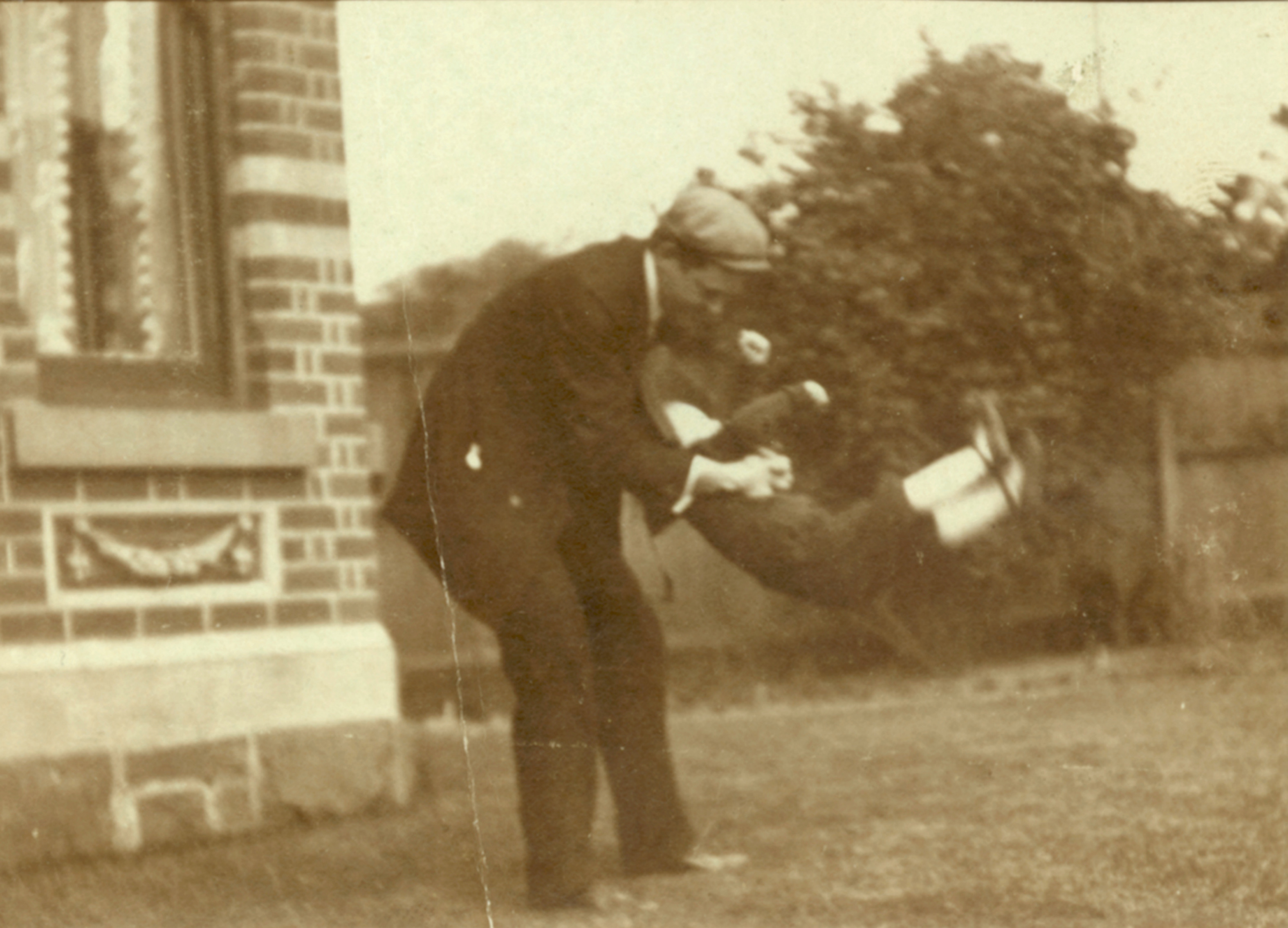
Hoover playing with his father in 1905

=== Early years, 1903–1928 ===
Herbert Charles Hoover was born in London on August 4, 1903. He was the elder son of President Herbert Clark Hoover (1874–1964) and First Lady Lou Henry (1874–1944). He was named for his father, Herbert, and his maternal grandfather, Charles Delano Henry, but throughout his life was known as Herbert Hoover Jr. His father, an engineer, was in London working for Bewick, Moreing & Co. By the age of two, Herbert Jr. had been round the world twice. One of his earliest memories was riding a wagon piled high with gold with his father in Australia. The family lived near Stanford University while he was growing up, and he took great pride in serving as water boy for the Stanford Indians football team. During the 1918 flu pandemic, Hoover contracted influenza, which left him with a hearing impairment that affected him for the rest of his life. Hoover began taking an interest in radio sets at age 14. He attended his father's alma mater, Stanford University, graduating with a degree in general engineering in 1925. He later studied at the Harvard Business School and was awarded a Master of Business Administration with distinction before winning a fellowship from the Daniel Guggenheim Fund to study aviation economics. His work focused on the economics of radio in the aviation sector.

=== Aviation radio, 1928–1930 ===
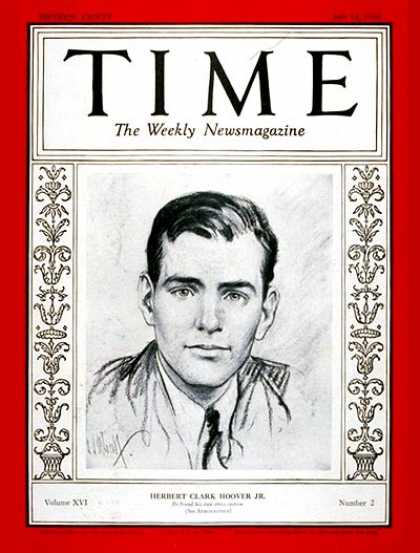
Herbert Hoover Jr., on the cover of Time, July 14, 1930

In 1928, Herbert Jr was hired by Western Air Express to set up its communications system. Over the next year and a half, he set up a network of stations across the Western U.S. capable of guiding radio-equipped aircraft along 15,000 miles of airways. As communications chief of Western Air Express, he soon was managing a staff of 75 engineers and overseeing the purchase of over $200,000 of radio equipment. In June 1930, he was promoted to chief engineer of Western Air Express. During his time with Western Air Express, he was mainly located at Alhambra, California, but also made frequent trips to the airline's headquarters in Los Angeles. In 1929, Western Air Express, Boeing and American Airways formed a non-profit corporation, Aeronautical Radio Inc. to serve as the airline industry's single licensee and coordinator of radio communication outside of the government. Pan Am and Curtiss-Wright also agreed to participate.) Hoover was selected as the first president of Aeronautical Radio Inc., a selection that led to Time magazine putting Hoover on its July 14, 1930 cover.

=== Geophysical engineer and adviser to foreign governments, 1930–1953 ===
Hoover did not stay at Western Air Express, however. During the 1930 election, there were rumors that Western Air Express had only won certain government contracts because of Hoover's status as the president's son, and saying that Hoover's advancement owed more to his famous name than his talent. Hoover submitted a letter of resignation in response to the allegations. Shortly thereafter, he was diagnosed with tuberculosis, and he spent 1931 convalescing, first at Rapidan Camp, then at Asheville, North Carolina. After his convalescence, he briefly returned to the airline, then taught business economics to aeronautical engineering students at the California Institute of Technology. He and his brother Allan also purchased the Herbert Hoover Birthplace at this time.

Hoover's interest in radio next turned him to the field of exploration geophysics, and the use of radio to prospect for oil. He founded United Geophysical, headquartered in Pasadena, California, in 1935 and by 1939 he had 200 employees working in five labs perfecting the art of exploring for oil by seismological means. In 1937, he founded a related company, Consolidated Engineering Corporation, which focused on instrument manufacturing.

Hoover's hearing impairment made him ineligible to serve in the United States armed forces during World War II.

In 1943, President of Venezuela Isaías Medina Angarita invited Hoover to advise the Venezuelan government in the negotiation of oil contracts with foreign governments. While there, Hoover oversaw a substantial rewriting of Venezuela's oil laws, which would provide a model for other countries in the years to come.

In 1944, the new Shah of Iran, Mohammad Reza Pahlavi, hired Hoover's company to advise the government of Iran in the negotiation of new oil concessions. At the time, the only oil company operating in Iran was the Anglo-Iranian Oil Company, operating under the terms of the D'Arcy Concession, as renegotiated in 1933. After the Anglo-Soviet invasion of Iran, Standard Oil, the Socony-Vacuum Oil Company, the Sinclair Oil Corporation, Shell, and the Soviet Union all sought access to the Iranian oil fields. Hoover provided the Iranian government with technical advice about the size of their oil reserves to allow the Iranian government to negotiate a fair deal.

United Geophysical was later bought by Union Oil, though Hoover stayed on as president of the company. Consolidated Engineering went public in 1945 and Hoover sold all of his stock.

=== Special Envoy, 1953–1954 ===
In the wake of the Abadan Crisis and the 1953 Iranian coup d'état, in September 1953, President of the United States Dwight D. Eisenhower asked Hoover to travel to Iran as his special envoy to attempt to broker a deal between the U.S., Britain and Iran. United States Secretary of State John Foster Dulles asked Hoover to work out a deal in 45 days; Hoover stayed in Tehran from October 17 to November 4 1953. He ultimately worked out a deal whereby, in August 1954, the National Iranian Oil Company became a consortium owned 40% by the Anglo-Iranian Oil Company; 40% to be divided equally (8% each) among the five major American companies; BP to have a 40% share; Shell to have 14%; and the Compagnie Française des Pétroles, a French Company, to receive 6%. Iran got now 25% of the profits compared to 20% of the original treaty with the AIOC. Officials at the United States Department of State praised Hoover's conduct during these negotiations as the greatest one-man performance since John Foster Dulles' work during the negotiations over the Treaty of San Francisco.

=== Under Secretary of State, 1954–1957 ===
Eisenhower was impressed by Hoover's performance as well. Eisenhower now asked Hoover to become Under Secretary of State. Hoover agreed and, after Senate confirmation, he would serve as Under Secretary of State from October 4, 1954 until February 5, 1957. Hoover was initially criticized for his performance, in particular because his hearing impairment led to the perception he was gruff and his insistence on perfection led to the perception he was indecisive. Owing to Secretary of State John Foster Dulles' frequent illnesses, Hoover was often Acting Secretary of State, and in this capacity made two decisions widely regarded as missteps: (1) he rejected a Chinese overture in April 1955 to negotiate agreements that could prevent war between the two countries; and (2) indecision as to whether to ship 18 tanks to Saudi Arabia in winter 1955 over the objections of Israel. By late 1956, however, Hoover was generally regarded as having learned the job, and was seen as a capable manager when Dulles was hospitalized.

=== Amateur radio ===
Hoover was an amateur radio operator holding the call W6ZH. He was elected as President of the American Radio Relay League in 1962; the primary representative organization of amateur radio operators to the U.S. government.

=== Death ===
Hoover died at Huntington Memorial Hospital in Pasadena on July 9, 1969. He had suffered a sudden stroke three days earlier on July 6 and never regained consciousness.

== Family ==
Herbert Charles Hoover married Margaret Eva Watson in 1925. They had three children: Margaret Ann Hoover Brigham (March 17, 1926 – February 14, 2011), Herbert "Pete" Hoover III (November 5, 1927 – February 4, 2010), and Joan Leslie Hoover (April 12, 1930 – May 10, 2002).

Awards and achievements
Preceded by Louis D. Brandeis	Cover of Time; July 14, 1930	Succeeded by David A. Reed
