= Allan Hoover =

American businessman (1907–1993)

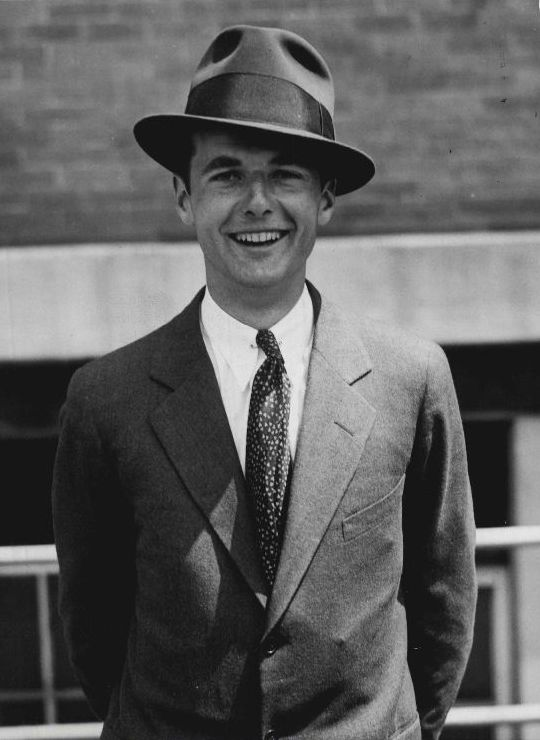
- Hoover in 1930
- Born: Allan Henry Hoover; July 17, 1907; London, England
- Died: November 4, 1993 (aged 86); Portola Valley, California, U.S.
- Education: Stanford University (BA); Harvard University (MBA)
- Occupations: Mining engineer; rancher; financier
- Spouse: Margaret Coberly (m. 1937)
- Children: 3
- Parents: Herbert Hoover (father); Lou Henry Hoover (mother)
- Relatives: Herbert Hoover Jr. (brother); Margaret Hoover (granddaughter)

Allan Henry Hoover (July 17, 1907 – November 4, 1993) was a British-born American mining engineer, rancher, financier, and the younger son of President Herbert Hoover and First Lady Lou Henry.

== Early life and education ==
Hoover was born in London on July 17, 1907. His elder brother was Herbert Hoover Jr. (1903–1969). He was raised in Palo Alto, California, and graduated from Palo Alto High School. His mother was First Lady Lou Henry Hoover, and his father was President Herbert Hoover. He earned a bachelor's degree from Stanford University and also studied towards a master's degree at Harvard Business School before pursuing a career in the banking industry.

== Career ==
For years, Hoover served in foundations and institutions, honoring the Hoover family, such as 50-year leadership of the Hoover Institution at Stanford University. Moreover, he bought his father's birthplace in West Branch, Iowa for $4,500 and turned it into the Herbert Hoover Presidential Library and Museum. He also served his interests worldwide in mining, agriculture, and financing.

== Personal life ==
He was married to Margaret Coberly Hoover with whom he had two sons, Andrew and Allan Jr., and a daughter, Lou Henry. His granddaughter (via Andrew) is Margaret Hoover. In his retirement, Hoover split his time between the San Francisco Bay Area and Greenwich, Connecticut.

He died in Portola Valley, California, on November 4, 1993. His funeral was held in West Branch, Iowa.
