= Niggers in the White House =

20th-century poem

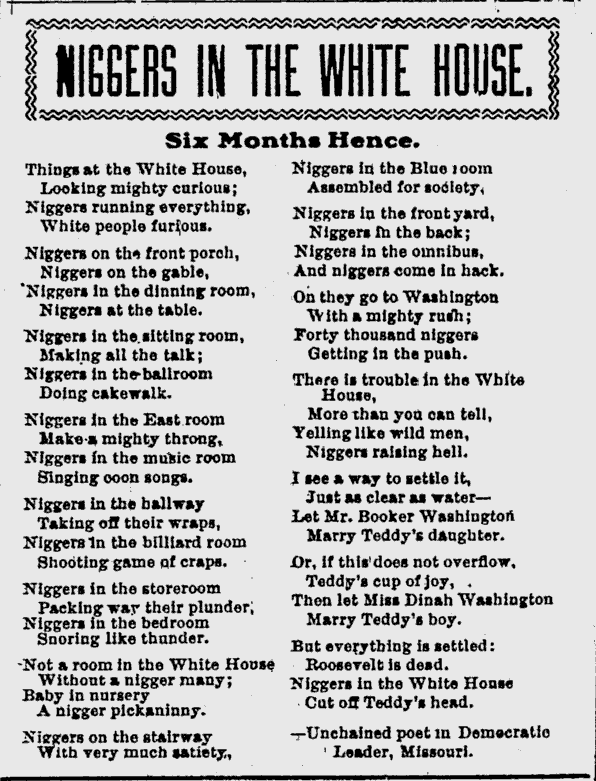
The poem published by the Kentucky New Era on March 13, 1903

"Niggers in the White House" is a poem first published in American newspapers in 1901. It was written in reaction to a White House dinner hosted on October 16, 1901 by President Theodore Roosevelt, who had invited Black presidential adviser Booker T. Washington and his family as guests. The identity of the poem's author—who used the byline "unchained poet"—remains unknown.

The poem is composed of 14 four-line stanzas, in each of which the second and fourth lines rhyme. It also frequently uses the racial slurs nigger (over 20 times) to refer to Washington and his family. Republican senator Hiram Bingham III described the poem as "indecent, obscene doggerel." It was republished in 1929 after First Lady Lou Henry Hoover, the wife of President Herbert Hoover, invited Jessie De Priest, the wife of Black congressman Oscar Stanton De Priest, to a tea for wives of congressmen at the White House.

Both visits triggered widespread condemnation by white supremacists throughout the U.S., particularly in the American South. Numerous congressmen and state legislators voiced objections to Black people being guests of the first family of the United States.

== History ==
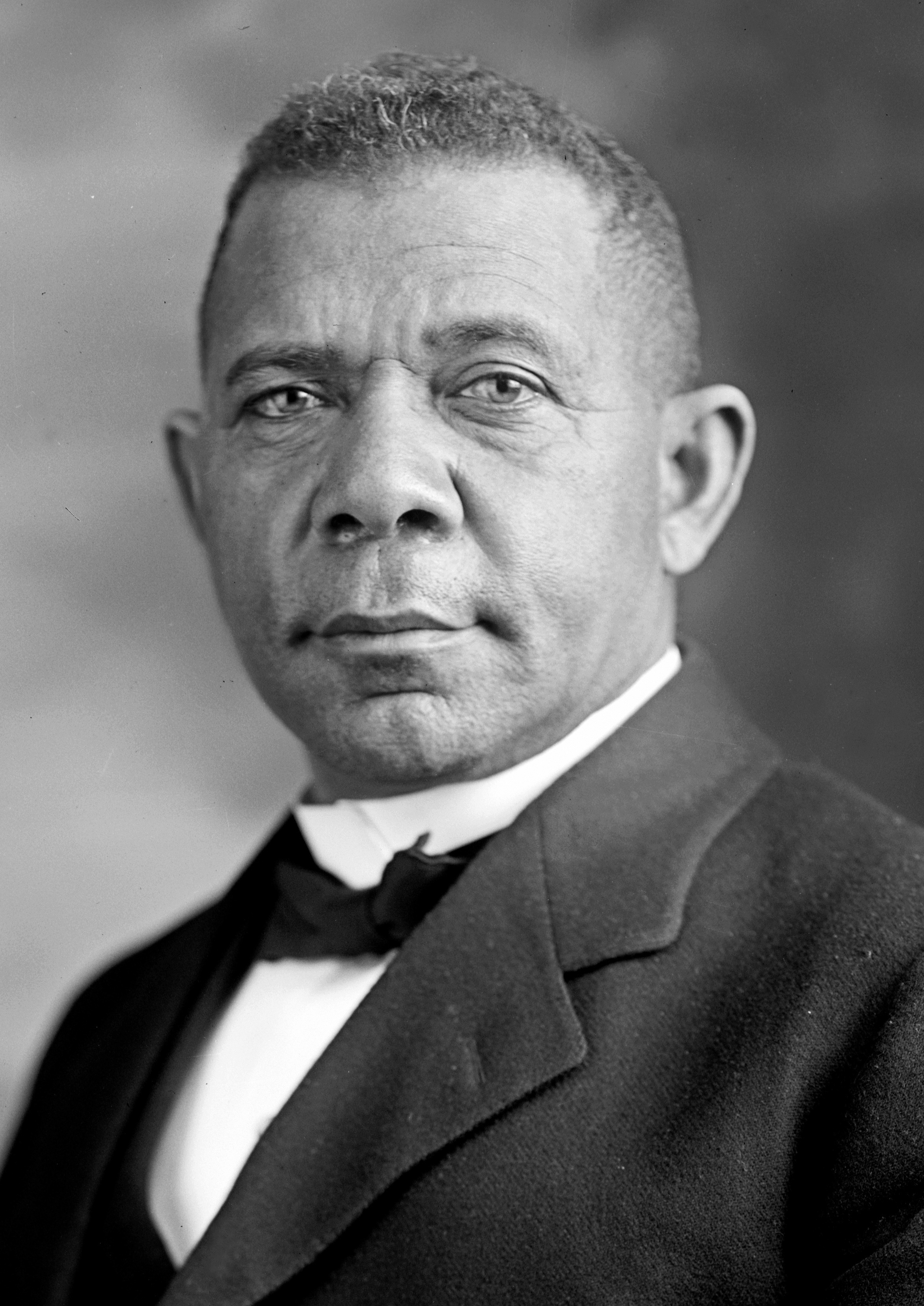
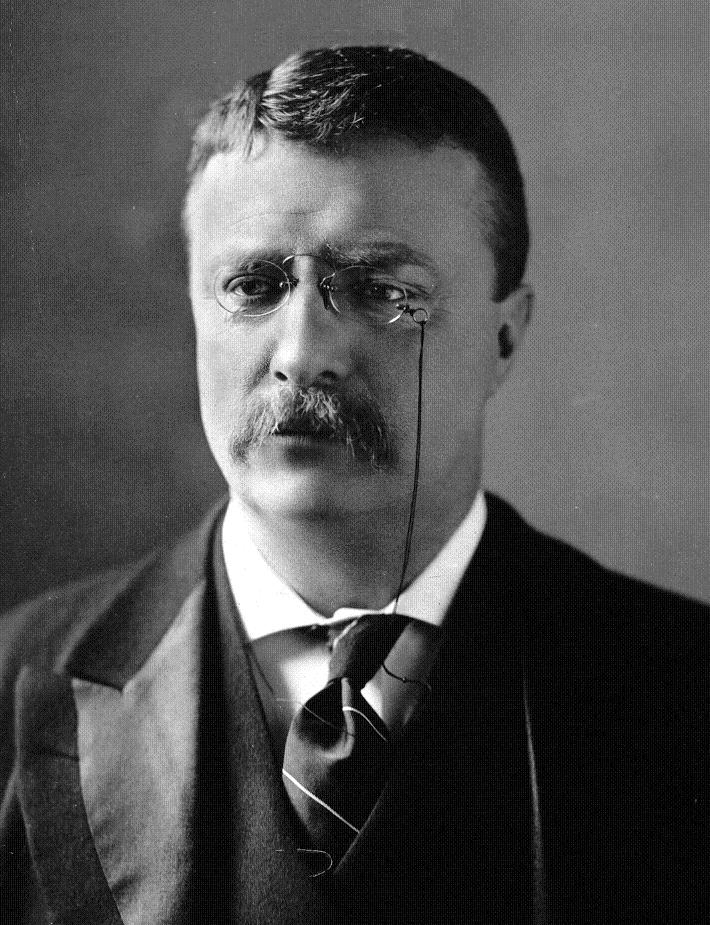
Left: Booker T. Washington (titular character); Right: Theodore Roosevelt

The poem by "unchained poet" was written in 1901, appearing in Sedalia, Missouri's Sedalia Sentinel as "Niggers in the White House" on 25 October. It followed widespread news reports that President Theodore Roosevelt and his family had dinner with African-American presidential adviser Booker T. Washington at the White House on 16 October of that year. Several journalists and politicians condemned Roosevelt's action, claiming, among other things, that such an act made the two men appear equal in terms of social status. Democratic senator Benjamin Tillman from South Carolina remarked, "The action of President Roosevelt in entertaining that nigger will necessitate our killing a thousand niggers in the South before they will learn their place again."

The poem was reprinted in the Greenwood Commonwealth in January 1903, after which it circulated in a number of newspapers during 1903, including in The Dispatch on 18 February 1903 and the Kentucky New Era on 10 March 1903. A card-mounted copy of the poem cut from the Sedalia Sentinel forms part of the Theodore Roosevelt papers preserved by the Library of Congress. A typed caption had been added, stating, "Publications like this show something of what is the matter with Missouri."

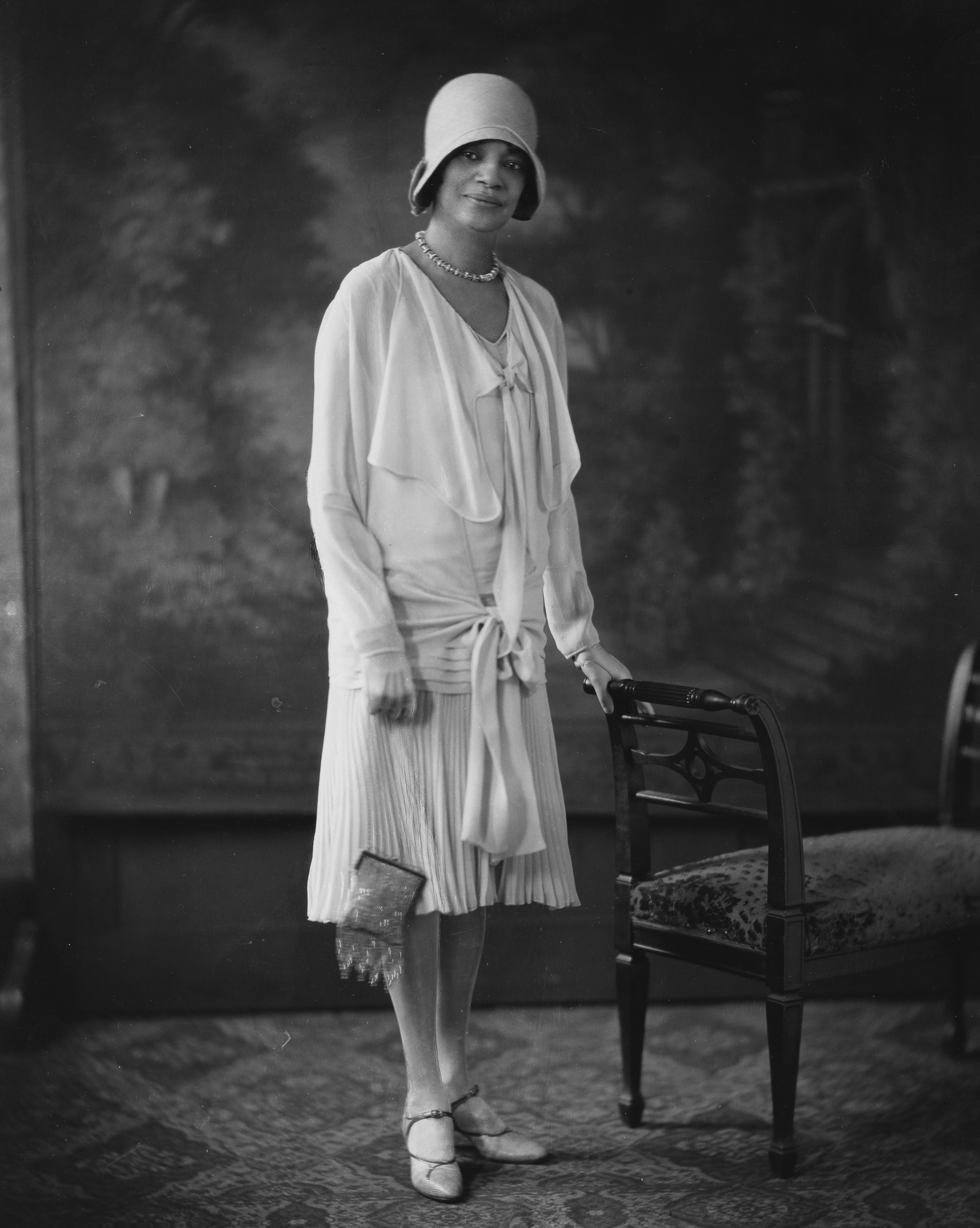
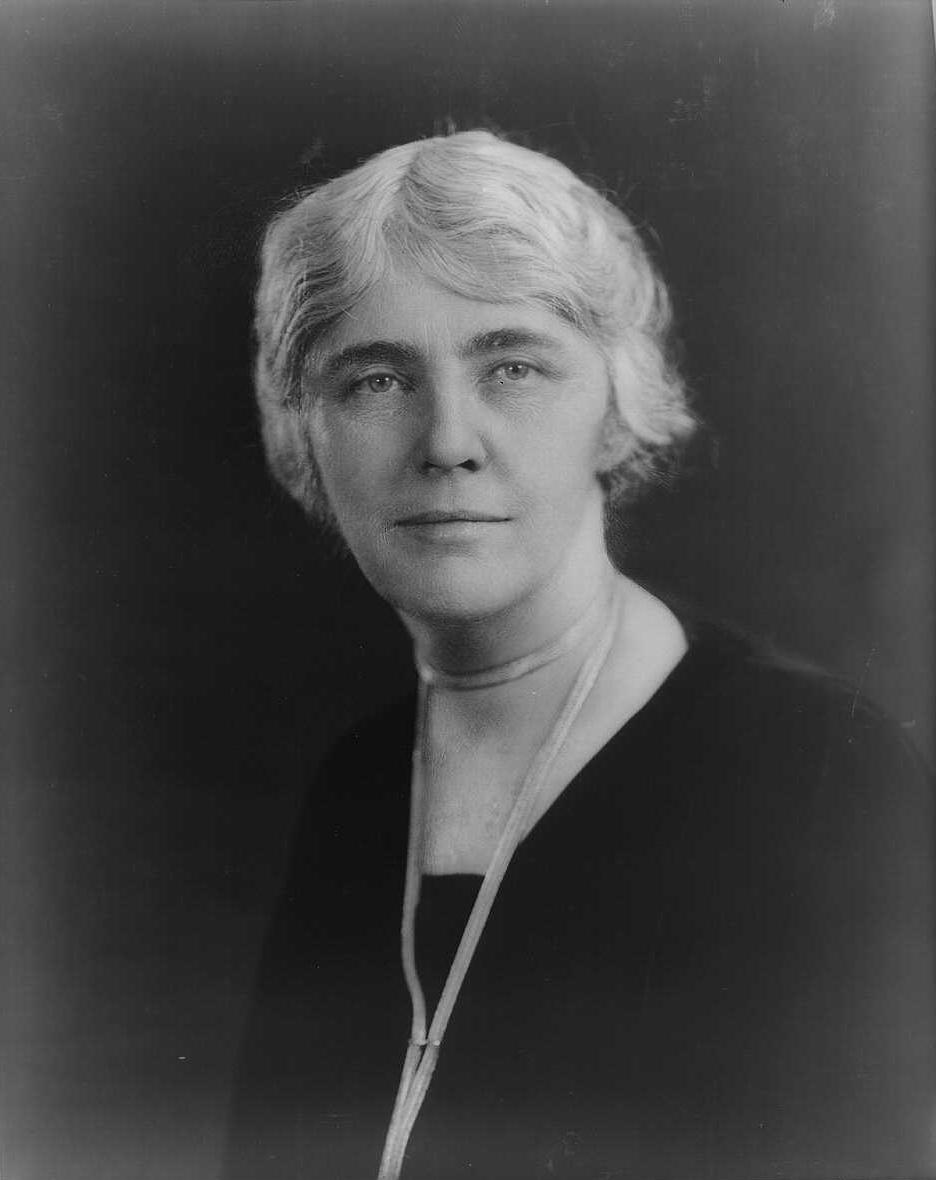
Left: Mrs. Jessie De Priest; Right: First Lady Lou Hoover

The poem resurfaced in June 1929 due to a public outcry triggered by another White House invitation. First Lady Lou Hoover, wife of President Herbert Hoover, invited the wife of Oscar DePriest to a tea event. De Priest was a member in the House of Representatives and the only African-American member in Congress in 1929. Mrs. Hoover had a series of teas with the wives of congressmen and Jessie De Priest was among the guests. Southern congressmen and newspapers reacted with public denouncements of the event. Democratic senator Coleman Blease from South Carolina inserted the poem within a Senate resolution entitled, "To request the Chief Executive to respect the White House" in the upper chamber of Congress, which was read aloud on the floor of the United States Senate. However, the resolution, including the poem, was by unanimous agreement excised from the Congressional Record due to protests from Republican senators Walter Edge (from New Jersey) and Hiram Bingham (from Connecticut). Bingham described the poem as "indecent, obscene doggerel" which gave "offense to hundreds of thousands of our fellow citizens and [...] to the Declaration of Independence and our Constitution". Blease withdrew the resolution, but stated he did so "because it gave offense to his friend, Senator Bingham and not because it might give any offense to the Negro race". Scholar David S. Day argues that Blease's use of the poem may have been a populist gesture—"a normal Southern demagogic tactic"—but that Hoover's supporters saw it as something that went beyond even the "broad limits" of partisan political point-scoring.

== Composition ==
The poem is composed of 14 stanzas with four lines per stanza. Every stanza is written in the simple 4-line rhyme scheme (ABCB). The term "nigger" is used in all the stanzas of the poem except two. It is ascribed to "unchained poet", whose identity is unknown.

In Congressman Blease's version of the poem, the last four stanzas were omitted. The last three stanzas mention President Theodore "Teddy" Roosevelt and Booker T. Washington by name and the names of their respective children.

Edward J. Robinson links the poem's comments about racial intermarriage to a "Southern rape complex", according to which racial purity was threatened by the possibility of segregation dispersing in society, and by African-American male interest in Caucasian women.

== Excerpt ==
The final three stanzas of the poem:

I see a way to settle it
Just as clear as water,
Let Mr. Booker Washington
Marry Teddy's daughter.

Or, if this does not overflow
Teddy's cup of joy,
Then let Miss Dinah Washington
Marry Teddy's boy.

But everything is settled,
Roosevelt is dead;
Niggers in the White House
Cut off Teddy's head.

== See also ==
- A Guest of Honor – the first opera created by Scott Joplin, the celebrated composer of ragtime music. The operatic production was based on the 1901 White House dinner hosted by President Theodore Roosevelt for Booker T. Washington.
- Racism and ethnic discrimination in the United States
