= Booker T. Washington dinner at the White House =

Historical US event demonstrating race relations

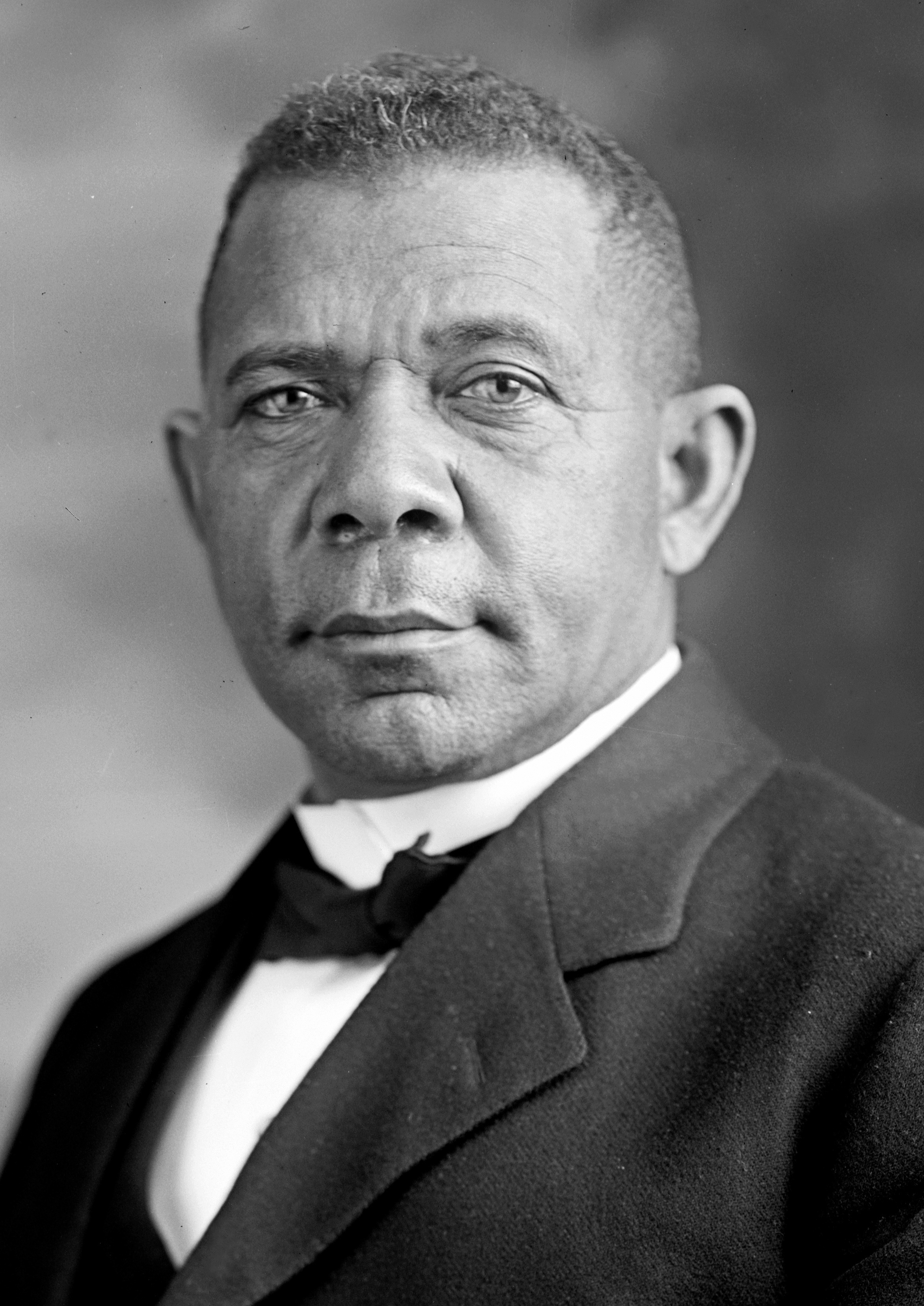
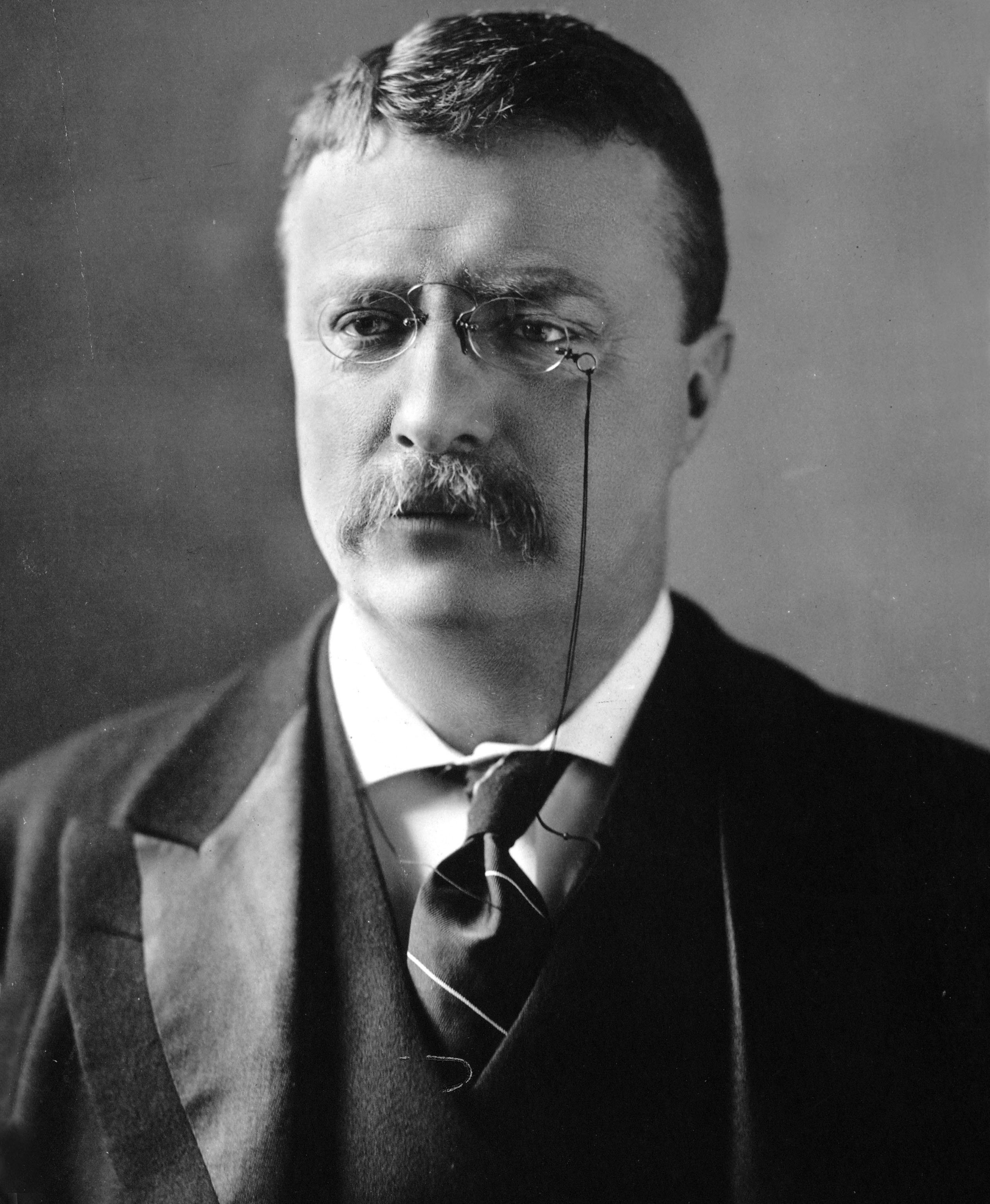
Booker T. Washington; Theodore Roosevelt

On October 16, 1901, shortly after moving into the White House, President Theodore Roosevelt invited his adviser, the African American spokesman Booker T. Washington, to dine with him and his family. The event provoked an outpouring of condemnation from white politicians and press in the American South.

== Background ==
Roosevelt, while governor of New York, frequently had black guests to dinner at the Executive Mansion and sometimes invited them to sleep over.

This instance was not the first time African Americans were invited to dinner at the White House. In 1798 John Adams had dined in the President's House in Philadelphia with Joseph Bunel (a mulatto representative of the Government of Haiti) and his black wife. Black people, including leaders such as Frederick Douglass and Sojourner Truth, had been received at the White House by Presidents Lincoln, Grant, Hayes and Cleveland. At the invitation of First Lady Lucy Hayes, Marie Selika Williams became the first African American professional musician to appear at the White House.

== Reception ==
The following day, the White House released a statement headed, "Booker T Washington of Tuskegee, Alabama, dined with the President last evening."

The response from the southern press and politicians was immediate, sustained and vicious. James K. Vardaman, a Democrat from Mississippi, complained that the White House was now, "so saturated with the odor of nigger that the rats had taken refuge in the stable;" the Memphis Scimitar declared it "the most damnable outrage which has ever been perpetrated by any citizen of the United States", and on 25 October the Missouri Sedalia Sentinel published on its front page a poem entitled "Niggers in the White House", which ended suggesting that either the president's daughter should marry Washington or his son one of Washington's relatives. Senator Benjamin Tillman stated, "The action of President Roosevelt in entertaining that nigger will necessitate our killing a thousand niggers in the South before they will learn their place again."

Governor of Georgia Allen Candler commented, "No self-respecting man can ally himself with the President, after what has occurred." He added that "No Southerner can respect any white man who would eat with a negro." Governor of South Carolina Miles McSweeney stated, "No white man who has eaten with a negro can be respected; it is simply a question of whether those who are invited to dine are fit to marry the sisters and daughters of their hosts."

William Jennings Bryan, the Democratic presidential candidate in 1896, 1900 and 1908, ridiculed the invitation as a device to secure black votes and promote the pipe dream of "social equality" between the races.

The Northern presses were more generous, acknowledging Washington's accomplishments and suggesting that the dinner was an attempt by Roosevelt to emphasize he was everybody's president. While some in the black community responded positively – such as Bishop Henry Turner who said to Washington, "You are about to be the great representative and hero of the Negro race, notwithstanding you have been very conservative" – other black leaders were less enthusiastic. William Monroe Trotter, a radical opponent of Washington, said the dinner showed him up as "a hypocrite who supports social segregation between blacks and whites while he himself dines at the White House."

The White House first responded to the outcry from the south by claiming that the meal had not occurred and that the Roosevelt women had not been at dinner with a black man; other White House personnel said it was a luncheon rather than an evening meal. Washington made no comment at the time.

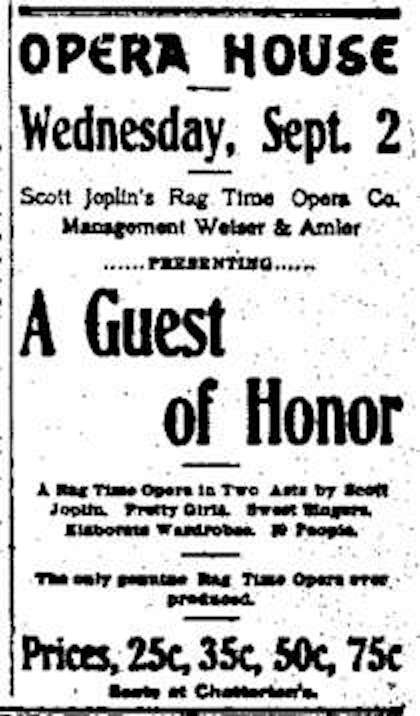

== In popular culture ==
A Guest of Honor, the first opera created by Scott Joplin, was based on Washington's dinner at the White House.

"Can You Blame the Colored Man", a hokum song by blues artist Gus Cannon, lampooned the event some 25 years later.

== See also ==
- 1929 Jessie De Priest tea at the White House
- List of dining events

== Sources ==
- Lusane, Clarence (2013). The Black History of the White House. San Francisco: City Lights Books. ISBN 978-0-87286-611-9.
