= Jessie De Priest tea at the White House =

Invitation of Jessie De Priest to the White House

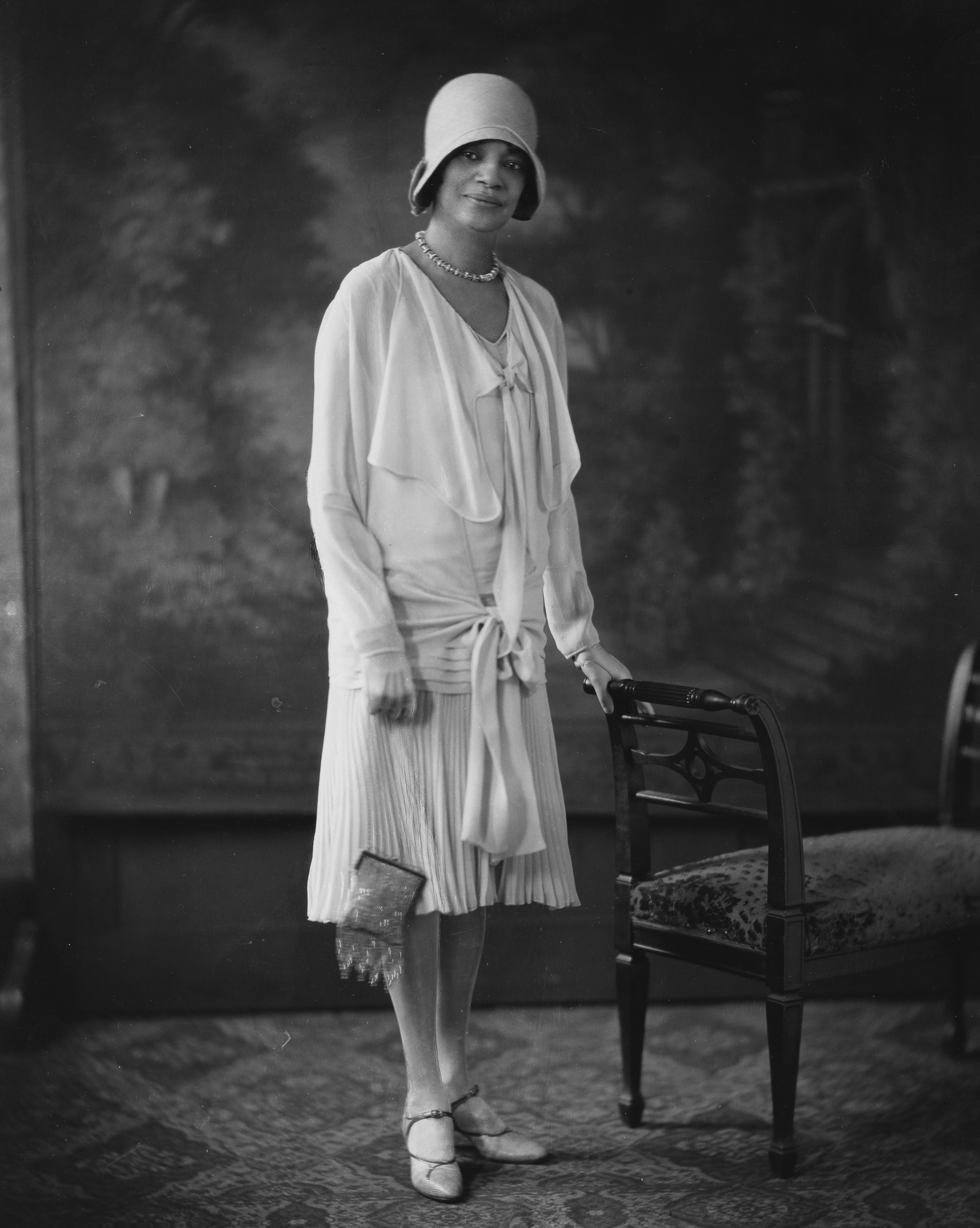
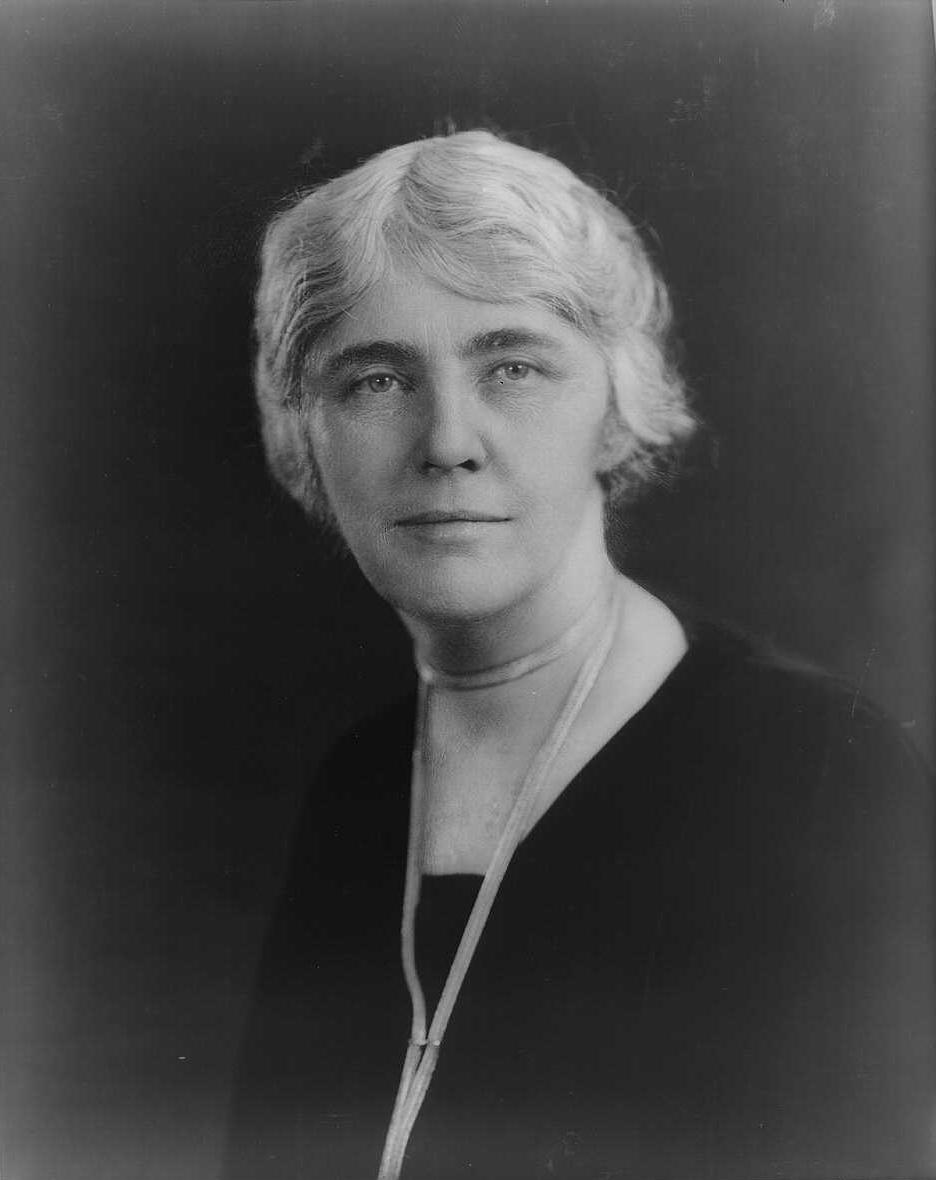
Left: Mrs. Jessie De Priest; Right: First Lady Lou Hoover

In 1929, First Lady of the United States Lou Hoover invited Jessie De Priest, wife of Chicago congressman Oscar Stanton De Priest, to the traditional tea hosted by new administrations for congressional wives at the White House. De Priest, a Republican, was the first African American elected to Congress in the 20th century and the first elected outside the Southern United States.

Southern politicians and journalists strongly objected to the invitation of De Priest with vitriolic attacks. The White House invitation served as a nexus of larger issues; at the turn of the century, the American South had disenfranchised most African Americans and excluded them from political life. Those states had also imposed white supremacist Jim Crow laws, including racial segregation in public facilities. However, Herbert Hoover had won five Southern states in his landslide election to the presidency in 1928; some of these legislatures were now most critical of the tea invitation.

The White House tea on June 12 followed a campaign in May and June 1929 by Congressman George H. Tinkham of Massachusetts, who tried to gain approval of a proposal to enforce provisions of the Fourteenth and Fifteenth Amendments against racial discrimination. Tinkham proposed to reduce the South's congressional apportionment and penalize the region for the largely Black portion of their voting populations they had disenfranchised. (Note: The 1930 Census did cause Alabama, Mississippi, Georgia, North Carolina and South Carolina to lose a total of six electoral votes due to black emigration since 1910.) This was defeated, but Democrats feared the reach of the Republican administration and latched on to the tea issue as a way to rally their ranks against Hoover on the issue of segregation.

== Background ==
During the Civil War and afterward, presidents Lincoln, Grant, Hayes, Cleveland and Coolidge had received black leaders such as Frederick Douglass and Sojourner Truth at the White House. In 1798 President John Adams had dined in the executive residence with Joseph Bunel, a representative of the Haitian president during its revolution, and his black wife. Black Republicans (often of mixed race) were elected to Congress from the South during and after Reconstruction. In 1901 Republican president Theodore Roosevelt had entertained Booker T. Washington, a national leader who was president of Tuskegee Institute, a historically black college, to dinner at the White House.

However, from 1890 to 1908, Southern states dominated by white conservative Democrats passed new constitutions and laws to disenfranchise most blacks, excluding them from the political system. Nevertheless, these states continued to be represented in Congress in proportion to their total populations, giving the white Democrats outsized power. Additionally, those states had imposed white supremacy and Jim Crow customs, including legal racial segregation in public facilities. Blacks were relegated to second-class status, and therefore the Hoovers' invitation of Jessie De Priest to the White House along with other wives of congressmen shook the South's social structure.

Oscar Stanton De Priest was the first Black person elected to Congress in the 20th century and the first ever from outside the South. The Chicago district represented by De Priest had a reputation among some whites for political corruption, at a time when Chicago and other big cities were thought by whites to be dominated generally by machine politics built on ethnic immigrants and their descendants. Washington's high white society had also shunned the De Priest couple, but the White House had established a tradition for the First Lady to entertain congressional wives at tea, and Lou Hoover and the president never considered snubbing Jessie De Priest. Accounts differ as to whether she invited De Priest to the first or last of five teas, but she made sure that the other guests were women who would be hospitable.

In his election to the presidency, Herbert Hoover carried five southern states: Florida, North Carolina, Tennessee, Texas, and Virginia, which voted for him rather than the Democratic nominee, Alfred E. Smith, a Roman Catholic and Governor of New York. Both Republicans and Democrats were grappling with the implications of this crossover voting. In an early Southern Strategy, Hoover wanted to build a greater Republican presence in the South among whites; the Democrats were trying to find ways to mobilize their constituencies against him.

In May and June 1929, Republican Congressman George H. Tinkham argued in Congress for enforcement of the Fourteenth and Fifteenth amendments with penalties against the racial discrimination under way in the South. Specifically, he proposed that Southern congressional delegations should be reduced according to the large portions of their populations, as shown by census data, whom they had disenfranchised. Such reduction was provided for in the Fourteenth Amendment. Tinkham's proposals were defeated but added to the South's feeling of threat from Hoover's administration.

== Reception ==
Southern U.S. senators and congressmen commented publicly, among them men who had abandoned the Democratic presidential nominee, Al Smith, in 1928: Senator Lee S. Overman of North Carolina said of the invitation, "It was a great blow to the social stability of the South." Senator Morris Sheppard of Texas said, "I regret the incident beyond measure. It is recognition of social equality between the white and black races and is fraught with infinite danger to our white civilization." The Florida, Georgia, Mississippi and Texas legislatures issued condemnations of the White House's June 16 invitation of Jessie De Priest. Texas's only female state legislator, Margie Neal, said, "Mrs. Hoover has violated the most sacred social custom of the White House, and this should be condemned."

South Carolina Democratic Senator Coleman Blease inserted a highly offensive poem entitled "Niggers in the White House" into a resolution that was read aloud on the floor of the United States Senate. Following heated protests from Republican senators, the resolution, including the poem, was by unanimous agreement excised from the Congressional Record.

The Houston Chronicle, the Austin Times and the Memphis Commercial Appeal published scathing editorials opposing the invitation. Mississippi's Jackson Daily News declared, "The DePriest incident has placed [the] President and Mrs. Hoover beyond the pale of social recognition for the Southern people."

== Aftermath ==
The White House never commented on the press reports. Mrs. Hoover conducted her teas and Jessie De Priest attended. Congressman De Priest responded to the Southern insults with strong language of his own in public comments. Snubbed by Republicans Albert H. Vestal of Indiana and George M. Pritchard of North Carolina, De Priest excluded them and their wives from a guest list of all other Republican congressmen for a reception to benefit the NAACP.

The Solid South of white Democratic congressional delegations had control of important U.S. House committees after 1930 and successfully blocked efforts to radically change its apportionment, although African American (and white) emigration was to deprive six southern states of a total of twelve electoral votes in the subsequent four censuses. (Note: Arkansas and Mississippi each lost three congressional districts in that time, Alabama and Georgia two and South Carolina and Tennessee one. There were, however, large gains in apportionment for Florida and Texas in that time span, although these states would see presidential voter turnout rise between 1924 and 1964 by 1,600 percent in Florida and 300 percent in Texas, with the much larger increase in Florida being due to its 1937 abolition of the poll tax.) Disenfranchisement and racial segregation were maintained generally in the South until after passage of national civil rights legislation in 1964 and 1965, although marked increases in Southern presidential voter turnout began with the 1952 presidential election and continued during the next three.

== See also ==
- 1901 Booker T. Washington dinner at the White House
