= Oscar Stanton De Priest House =

- U.S. National Register of Historic Places
- U.S. National Historic Landmark
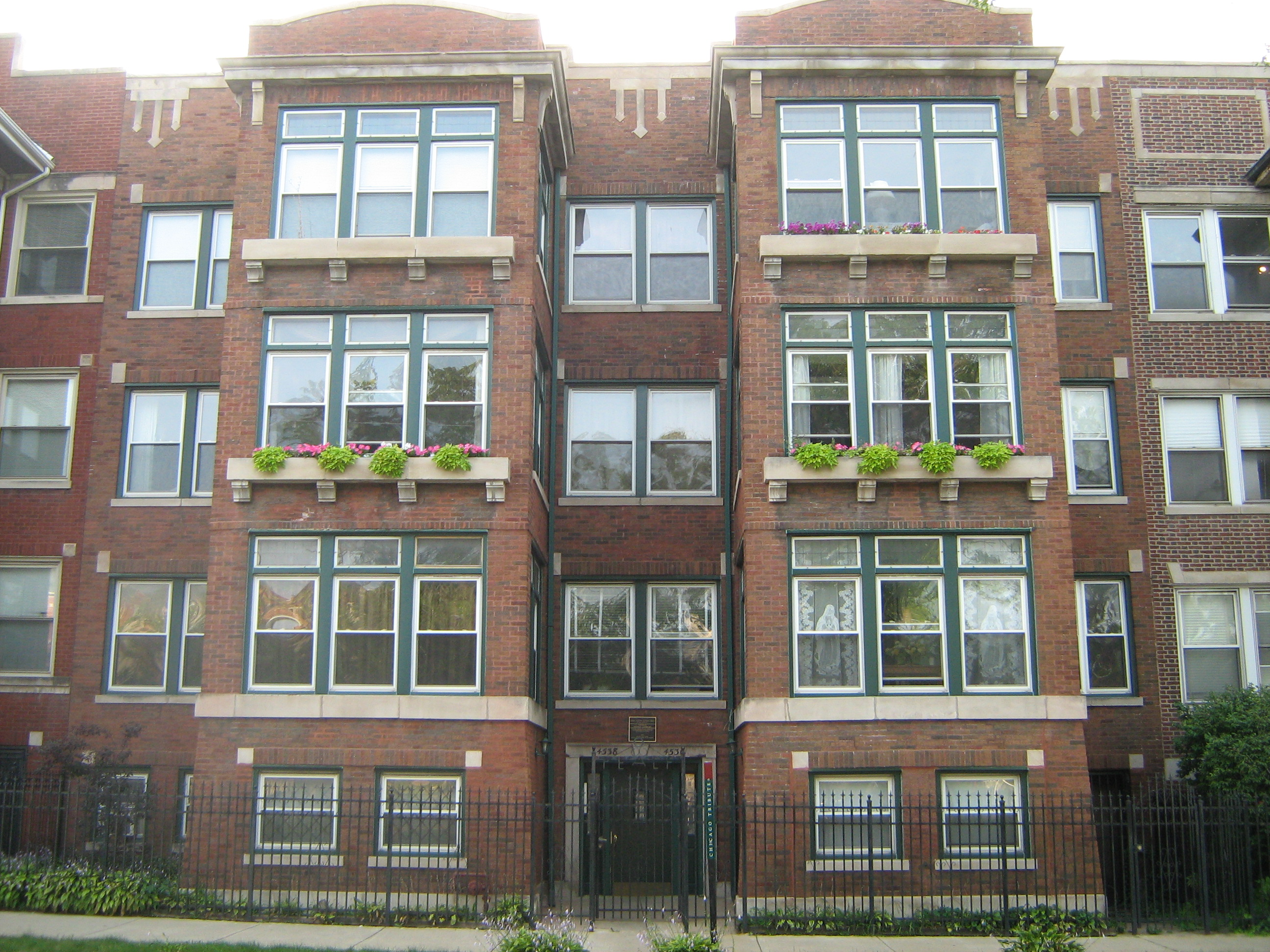

- Location within Illinois
- Location: 4536–4538 South Dr. Martin Luther King Jr. Blvd., Chicago, IL
- Coordinates: 41°48′42.08″N 87°37′4.65″W
- Area: less than one acre
- Built: c. 1920
- NRHP reference No.: 75000646

Significant dates
- Added to NRHP: May 15, 1975
- Designated NHL: May 15, 1975

The Oscar Stanton De Priest House is an historic apartment building at 4536–4538 South Dr. Martin Luther King Jr. Drive in Chicago, Illinois. It was built in 1920, and one of its units was from 1929 to 1951 home to Oscar Stanton De Priest (1871–1951), the first African-American to be elected to the United States Congress from a northern state. The building was designated a National Historic Landmark on May 15, 1975. It is not open to the public.

== Description and history ==
The Oscar Stanton De Priest House is located on Chicago's South Side community area of Grand Boulevard, on the west side of King Drive south of 45th Street. It is an architecturally-unexceptional three-story masonry structure built of brick with stone trim, with a full basement. It houses eight units, two to each floor including the basement. Its dominant features are projecting rectangular bays on both sides of the recessed entry, with bracketed flower boxes on the second and third floors and a bracketed cornice below the roof. Based on its styling, it was built about 1920.

Oscar Stanton De Priest lived with his wife, Jessie De Priest, in one of the second-floor units of this building from 1929 to his death, in 1951. A native of Alabama, he migrated to Chicago in the late 19th century, where he gained employment as a building contractor. He became active in local politics, winning election as a Cook County commissioner in 1904. In 1915, he was the first African-American to win a seat on Chicago's Board of Aldermen, representing the city's wealthy Second Ward. In 1928, De Priest was chosen as a late replacement on the Republican Party ticket in the election to Illinois's first Congressional district, replacing the incumbent Martin B. Madden, who died shortly after the primary. De Priest won and was seated in Congress over the objections of Southern representatives. As the first post-Reconstruction African-American in that body and the first from any northern state, De Priest became a prominent voice on matters of interest to African Americans, working in particular to secure equitable funding for the education of blacks. De Priest served three terms in Congress before he returned to city politics.

== See also ==
- List of National Historic Landmarks in Illinois
- National Register of Historic Places listings in South Side Chicago
