= Oscar Stanton De Priest =

American politician and civil rights advocate (1871–1951)

Oscar De Priest
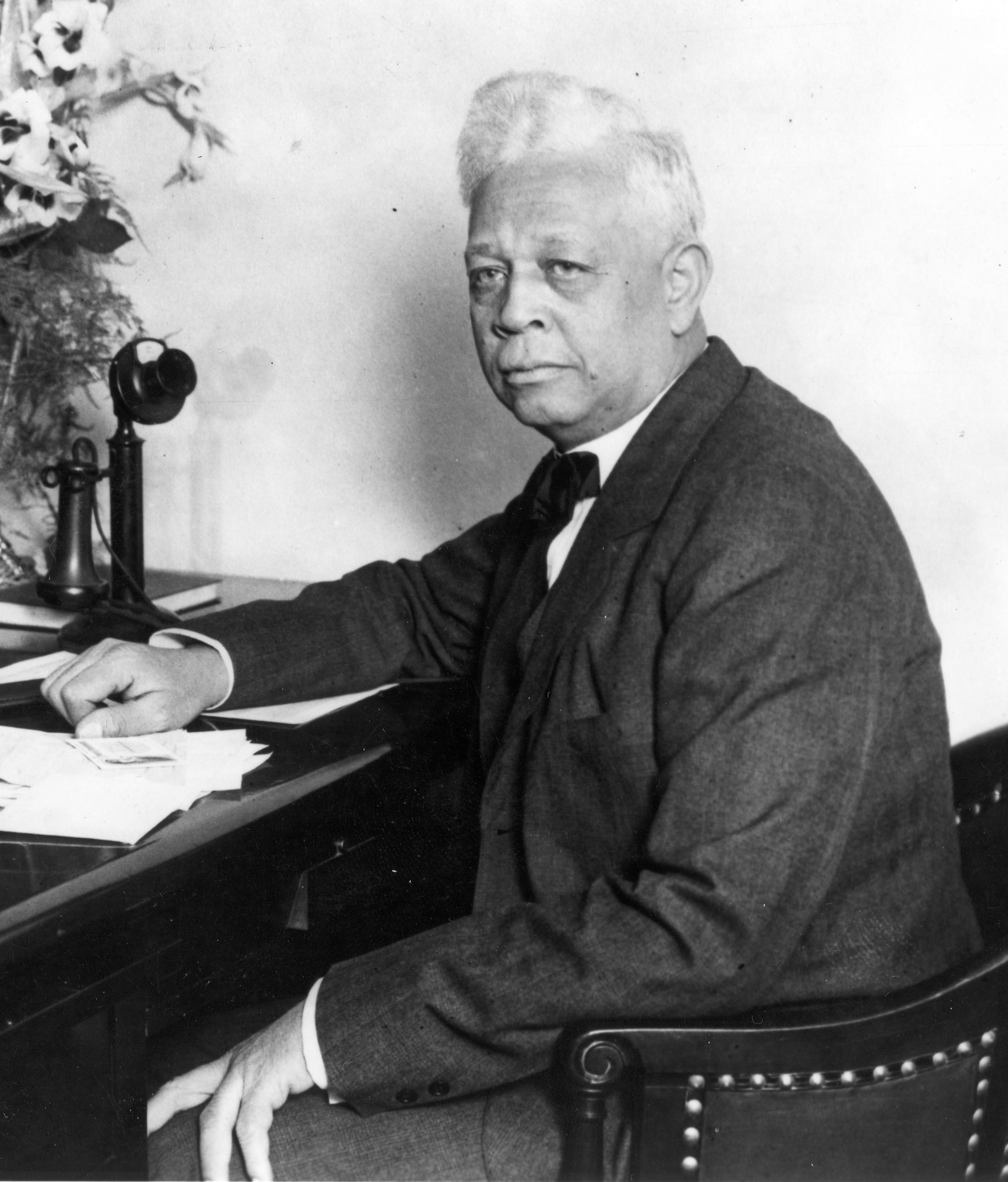

Member of the U.S. House of Representatives from Illinois's 1st district
- In office March 4, 1929 – January 3, 1935
- Preceded by: Martin B. Madden
- Succeeded by: Arthur W. Mitchell

Member of the Chicago City Council
- In office 1943–1947
- Preceded by: Benjamin A. Grant
- Succeeded by: Archibald Carey Jr.
- Constituency: 3rd Ward
- In office 1915–1917
- Preceded by: George F. Harding Jr.
- Succeeded by: Louis B. Anderson
- Constituency: 2nd ward

Member of the Cook County Board of Commissioners
- In office 1904–1908
- Preceded by: Archibald Carey Jr.

Personal details
- Born: March 9, 1871 Florence, Alabama, U.S.
- Died: May 12, 1951 (aged 80) Chicago, Illinois, U.S.
- Resting place: Graceland Cemetery
- Party: Republican
- Spouse: Jessie Williams (m. 1898)
- Children: 2

Oscar Stanton De Priest (March 9, 1871 – May 12, 1951) was an American politician and civil rights advocate from Chicago. A member of the Illinois Republican Party, he served as a U.S. representative from Illinois's 1st congressional district from 1929 to 1935. He was the first African American to be elected to Congress in the 20th century. During his three terms, he was the only African American serving in Congress. He was also the first African-American U.S. Representative from outside the southern states.

Born in Alabama to freedmen parents, De Priest was raised in Dayton, Ohio. He studied business and made a fortune in Chicago as a contractor, and in real estate and the stock market before the Crash. A successful local politician, he was elected an alderman to the Chicago City Council in 1914, the first African American to hold that office.

In Congress in the early 1930s, he spoke out against racial discrimination, including at speaking events in the South; tried to integrate the House public restaurant; gained passage of an amendment to desegregate the Civilian Conservation Corps, one of the work programs under President Franklin D. Roosevelt's New Deal; and introduced anti-lynching legislation to the House (it was not passed due to opposition by Democrats in the Solid South). In 1934, De Priest was defeated by Arthur W. Mitchell, the first African American to be elected as a Democrat to Congress. De Priest returned to Chicago and his successful business ventures, eventually returning to politics, when he was again elected an alderman in the 1940s.

== Early life and education ==
De Priest was born in 1871 in Florence, Alabama, to freedmen (former slaves) of mixed race. He had a brother named Robert. His mother, Martha Karsner, worked part-time as a laundress, and his father Neander was a teamster, associated with the Exodusters movement. After the Civil War, thousands of blacks left continued oppression by whites in the South by moving to other states that offered promises of freedom and greater economic opportunities, such as Kansas. Others moved later in the century.

In 1878, the year after Reconstruction had ended and federal troops been withdrawn from the region, the De Priests left Alabama for Salina, Kansas. Violence had increased in Alabama as whites were restoring white supremacy: the elder De Priest had to save his friend, former U.S. Representative James T. Rapier, from a lynch mob, and a black man was killed on their doorstep. The boy Oscar attended local schools in Salina.

== Career ==
=== Business ===
De Priest studied bookkeeping at the Salina Normal School, established also for the training of teachers. In 1889, he moved to Chicago, Illinois, which had been booming as an industrial city. He worked first as an apprentice plasterer, house painter, and decorator. He became a successful contractor and real estate broker. He built a fortune in the stock market and in real estate by helping black families move into formerly all-white neighborhoods, often ones formerly occupied by ethnic white immigrants and their descendants. There was population succession in many neighborhoods under the pressure of new migrants.

== Cook County Board of Commissioners and Chicago City Council ==
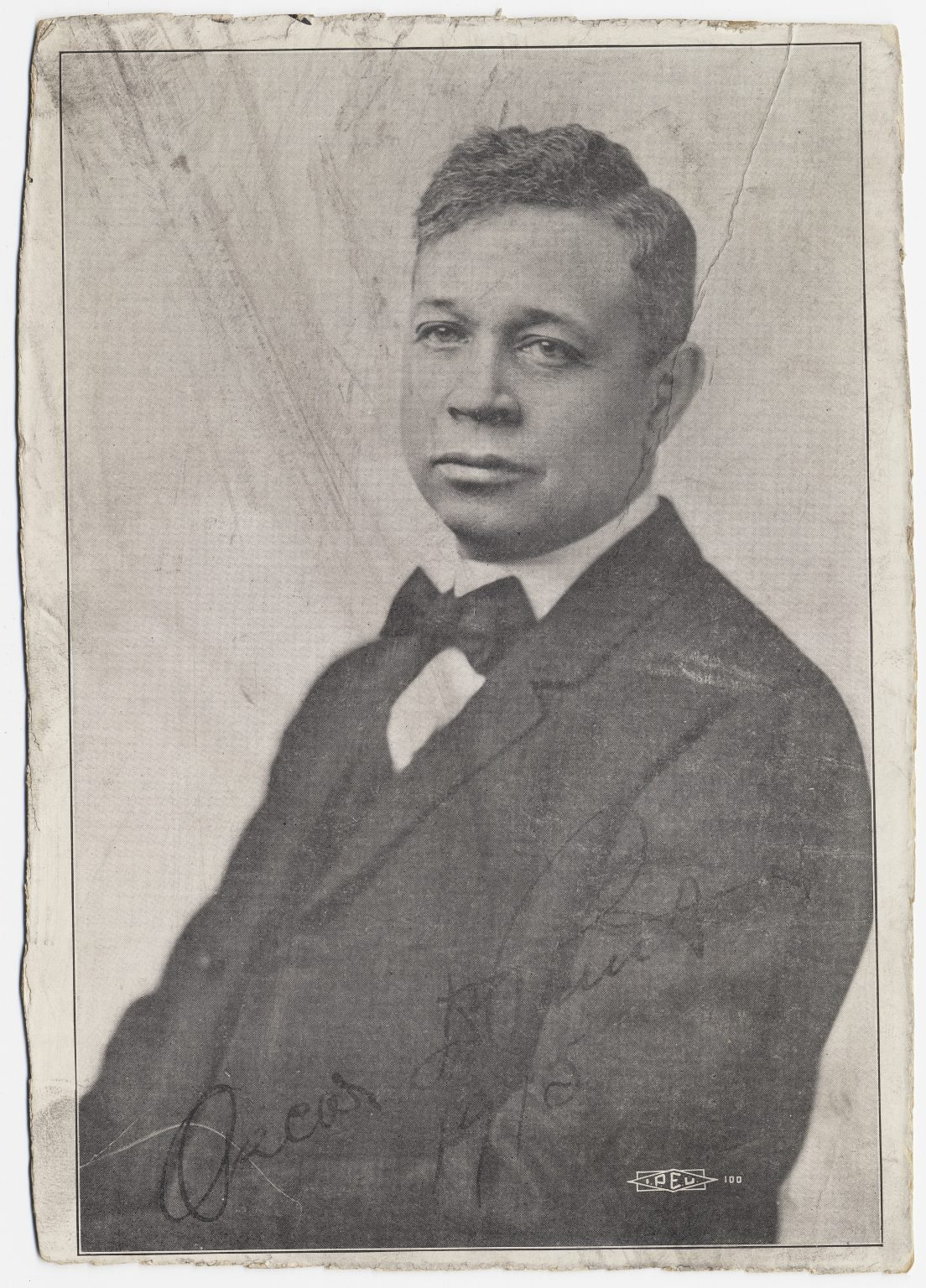
De Priest in 1915

From 1904 to 1908, De Priest was a member of the board of commissioners of Cook County, Illinois.

De Priest was elected in 1914 to the Chicago City Council, serving from 1915 to 1917 as alderman from the 2nd ward, on the South Side. He was Chicago's first black alderman.

=== Resignation and graft trial ===
In 1917 De Priest was indicted for alleged graft and resigned from the City Council. He hired nationally known Clarence Darrow as his defense attorney and was acquitted. Edward H. Morris worked with Darrow on De Priest's defense.

After De Priest resigned from the council, he was succeeded in office by Louis B. Anderson.

In 1919, De Priest ran unsuccessfully for alderman as a member of the People's Movement Club, a political organization he founded. In a few years, De Priest's black political organization became the most powerful of many in Chicago, and he became the top black politician under Chicago Republican mayor William Hale Thompson.

== U.S. House of Representatives (1929–35) ==
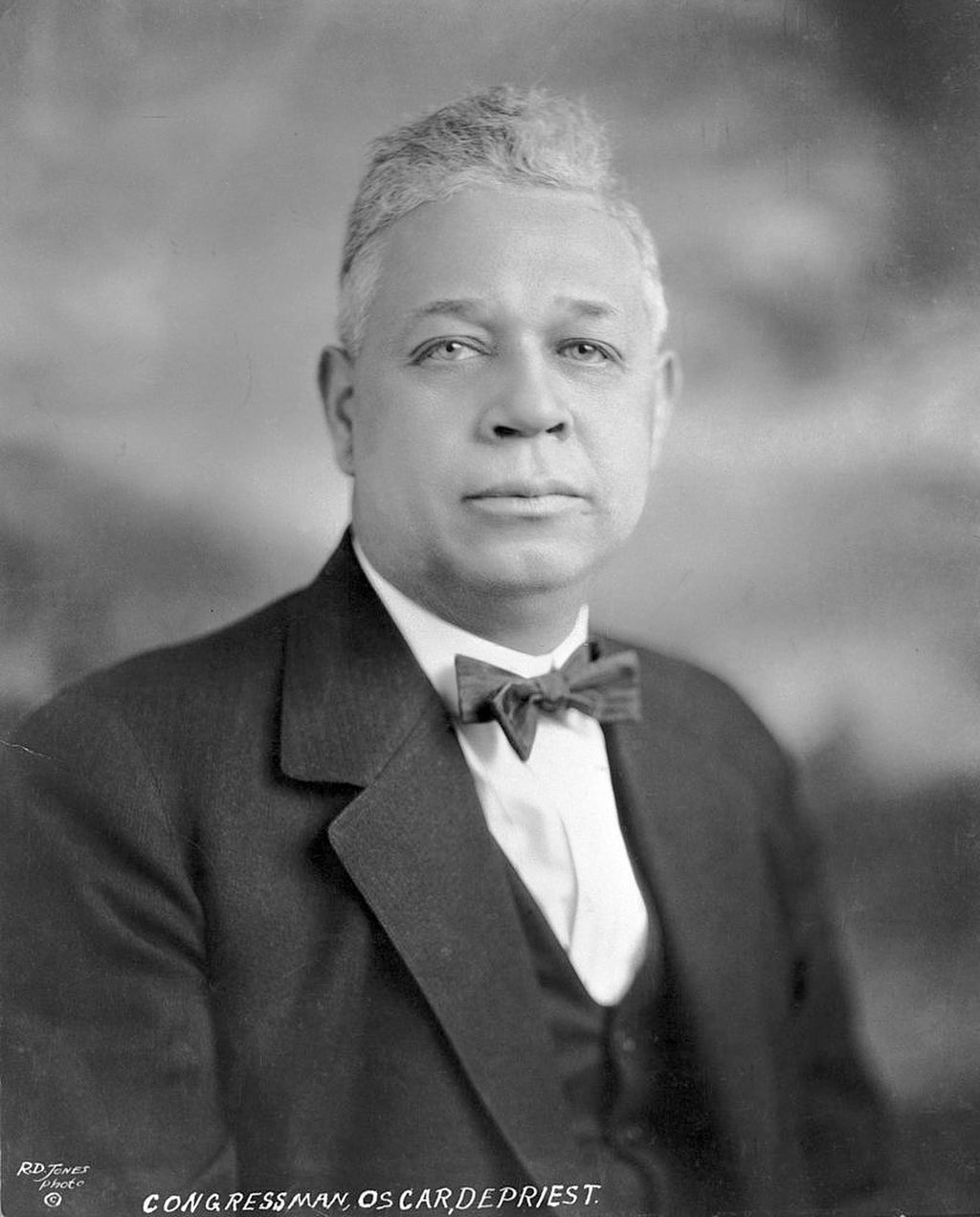
Portrait by R. D. Jones c. 1930

In 1928, when Republican congressman Martin B. Madden died, Mayor Thompson selected De Priest to replace him on the ballot. He was the first African American elected to Congress outside the South and the first to be elected in the 20th century. He represented the 1st Congressional District of Illinois (which included The Loop and part of the South Side of Chicago) as a Republican. During the 1930 election, De Priest was challenged in the primary by noted African-American spokesperson, orator, and Republican Roscoe Conkling Simmons. De Priest defeated Simmons' primary challenge and won the general election afterward. During De Priest's three consecutive terms (1929–1935), he was the only black representative in Congress. He introduced several anti-discrimination bills during these years of the Great Depression.

DePriest's 1933 amendment barring discrimination in the Civilian Conservation Corps (CCC), a program of the New Deal to employ people across the country in building infrastructure, was passed by the Senate and signed into law by President Franklin D. Roosevelt. His anti-lynching bill (House Joint Resolution 171, in 1933) failed due to opposition by the white Democrats of the Solid South, although it would not have made lynching a federal crime. (Previous anti-lynching bills had also failed to pass the Senate, which was dominated by the South since its disenfranchisement of blacks at the turn of the century.) He presented the legislation with a long and detailed speech in which he read newspaper reports and legal opinions: he included the names of victims of lynchings from 1927 on, and provided graphic details of these murders. A third proposal, a bill to permit a transfer of jurisdiction if a defendant believed he or she could not get a fair trial because of race or religion, was passed by a later Congress.

Civil rights activists criticized De Priest for opposing federal aid to the poor, although they nevertheless applauded him for making public speeches in the South despite death threats. They also praised De Priest for telling an Alabama senator he was not big enough to prevent him from dining in the private Senate restaurant. (Some Congressmen ate in the Senate restaurant to avoid De Priest, who usually ate in the Members Dining Room designated for Congressmen.) The public areas of the House and Senate restaurants were segregated. The House accepted that De Priest sometimes brought black staff or visitors to the Members Dining Room, but objected when he entertained mixed groups there.

De Priest defended the right of students of Howard University, a historically black college in Washington, D.C., to eat in the public section of the House restaurant and not be restricted to a section in the basement near the kitchen, used mostly by black employees and visitors. He took this issue of discrimination against the students (and other black visitors) to a special bipartisan House committee. In a three-month-long heated debate, the Republican political minority argued that the restaurant's discriminatory practice violated Fourteenth Amendment rights to equal access. The Democratic majority skirted the issue by claiming that the restaurant was a private facility and not open to the public. The House restaurant remained segregated through much of the 1940s and maybe as late as 1952.

Mostly aligned with the political right, De Priest generally opposed liberal federal programs under the New Deal, instead favoring increased initiatives on the state or local level. He also was vocal in his denunciation of communism, fearing that its influence would spread to disgruntled blacks. He unsuccessfully pushed to enact a special committee that would investigate the Communist Party of the United States.

In 1929, De Priest made national news when First Lady Lou Hoover invited his wife, Jessie De Priest, to a traditional tea for congressional wives at the White House.

De Priest appointed Benjamin O. Davis Jr. to the United States Military Academy at a time when the only African-American line officer in the Army was Davis's father.

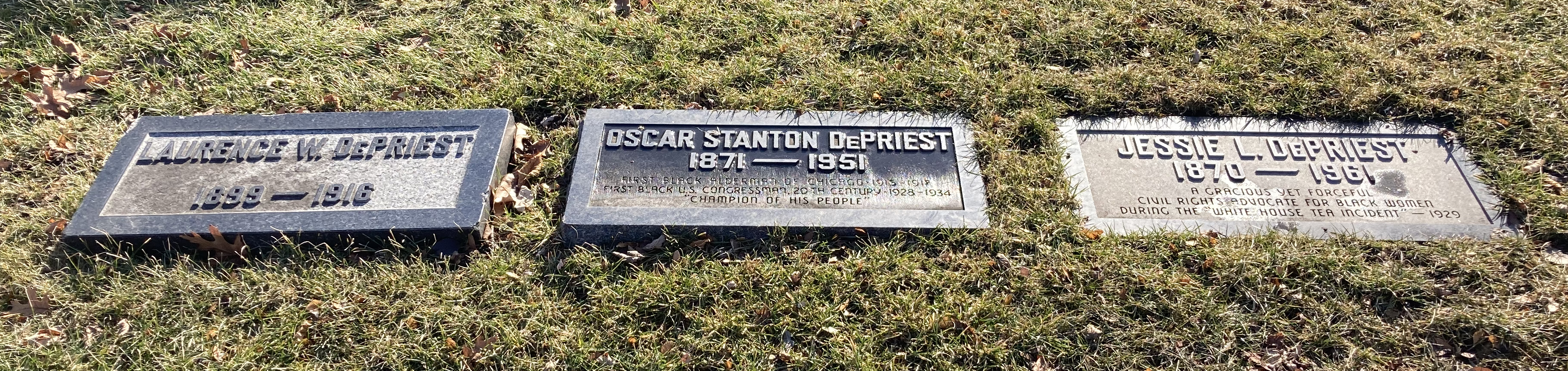
De Priest's grave at Graceland Cemetery

In September 1930, De Priest received an extortion letter from the "Brooklyn Rats" threatening to kill him if he didn't pay them $10,000. "You are not wanted in Washington," the letter declared. De Priest turned to the Secret Six, a vigilante group active from 1930 to 1933. The group traced the source of the letter back to minor Chicago political figure Julius Link, a milk truck driver named Solly Lason, and other local characters. Link got six months in prison for the crime.

By the early 1930s, De Priest's popularity waned because he continued to oppose higher taxes on the rich and fought Depression-era federal relief programs under President Roosevelt. De Priest was defeated in the 1934 United States House of Representatives elections by Republican-turned-Democrat African-American Arthur W. Mitchell, who campaigned on support for the New Deal. After returning to his businesses and political life in Chicago, De Priest was elected again to the Chicago City Council in 1943 as alderman of the 3rd Ward, serving until 1947. He died in Chicago at 80 and is buried in Graceland Cemetery.

== Personal life ==
De Priest married the former Jessie L. Williams (September 3, 1870 – March 31, 1961). They had two sons together: Laurence W. (1899 – July 28, 1916), who died at the age of 16, and Oscar Stanton De Priest Jr. (May 24, 1906 – November 8, 1983). A great-grandson of Oscar De Priest Jr., Philip R. DePriest, became the administrator of his estate after his grandmother's death in 1992. This included his great-grandfather's Oscar Stanton De Priest House, now a National Historic Landmark, which still held his locked political office. This had not been touched since about 1951. This great-grandson has been working to restore the office and house, and assessing the political archives—"a veritable treasure trove."

== Legacy and honors ==
- The Oscar Stanton De Priest House in Chicago, at 45th and King Drive, has been designated as a National Historic Landmark and city landmark.

== Electoral history ==
Illinois's 1st congressional district general election, 1928
Party	Candidate	Votes	%
Republican	Oscar DePriest	24,479	47.8
Democratic	Harry Baker	20,664	40.3
Independent	William Harrison	5,861	11.4
Independent	Benjamin W. Clayton	123	0.2
Independent	Edward L. Doty	100	0.2
Total votes		51,227	100

Illinois's 1st congressional district Republican primary, 1930
Party	Candidate	Votes	%
Republican	Oscar DePriest (incumbent)	17,103	70.5
Republican	Roscoe Simmons	5,049	20.8
Republican	Harry G. Borland	831	3.4
Republican	Richard E. Parker	799	3.3
Republican	George Hodge	494	2.0
Total votes		24,276	100

Illinois's 1st congressional district general election, 1930
Party	Candidate	Votes	%
Republican	Oscar DePriest (incumbent)	23,719	58.4
Democratic	Harry Baker	16,747	41.2
Independent	George W. Harts	68	0.2
Independent	T. W. Chavers	64	0.2
Independent	Edward Turner	44	0.1
Total votes		40,642	100

Illinois's 1st congressional district Republican primary, 1932
Party	Candidate	Votes	%
Republican	Oscar DePriest (incumbent)	21,252	76.8
Republican	Louis B. Anderson	5,457	19.7
Republican	James L. Scott	979	3.5
Total votes		27,688	100

Illinois's 1st congressional district general election, 1932
Party	Candidate	Votes	%
Republican	Oscar DePriest (incumbent)	33,672	54.8
Democratic	Harry Baker	26,959	43.9
Independent	Herbert Newton	843	1.4
Total votes		61,474	100

Illinois's 1st congressional district Republican primary, 1934
Party	Candidate	Votes	%
Republican	Oscar DePriest (incumbent)	18,054	94.6
Republican	Chandler Owen	1,034	5.4
Total votes		19,088	100

Illinois's 1st congressional district general election, 1934
Party	Candidate	Votes	%
Democratic	Arthur W. Mitchell	27,963	53.0
Republican	Oscar DePriest (incumbent)	24,829	47.0
Total votes		52,792	100

== See also ==
- List of African American firsts
- List of African-American United States representatives
- Oscar Stanton De Priest House

== Bibliography ==
- Day, S. Davis. "Herbert Hoover and Racial Politics: The De Priest Incident". Journal of Negro History 65 (Winter 1980): 6–17.
- Gosnell, Harold F. Negro politicians; the rise of Negro politics in Chicago (1935) online
- Hendricks, Wanda A. "'Vote for the Advantage of Ourselves and Our Race': The Election of the First Black Alderman in Chicago." Illinois Historical Journal 87.3 (1994): 171–184. JSTOR 40192719
- Mann, Kenneth Eugene. "Oscar Stanton DePriest: Persuasive Agent for the Black Masses." Negro History Bulletin 35.6 (1972): 134–137. JSTOR 24767380
- Nordhaus-Bike, Anne. "Oscar DePriest lived Pisces's call to service, unity." Gazette, March 7, 2008.
- Olasky, Martin. "History turned right side up". World magazine. 13 February 2010. p. 22.
- Rudwick, Elliott M. "Oscar De Priest and the Jim Crow Restaurant in the U.S. House of Representatives". Journal of Negro Education 35 (Winter 1966): 77–82.

U.S. House of Representatives
Preceded by Martin B. Madden	Member of the U.S. House of Representatives from Illinois's 1st congressional district 1929–1935	Succeeded by Arthur W. Mitchell
