= Lou Henry Hoover =

First Lady of the United States from 1929 to 1933

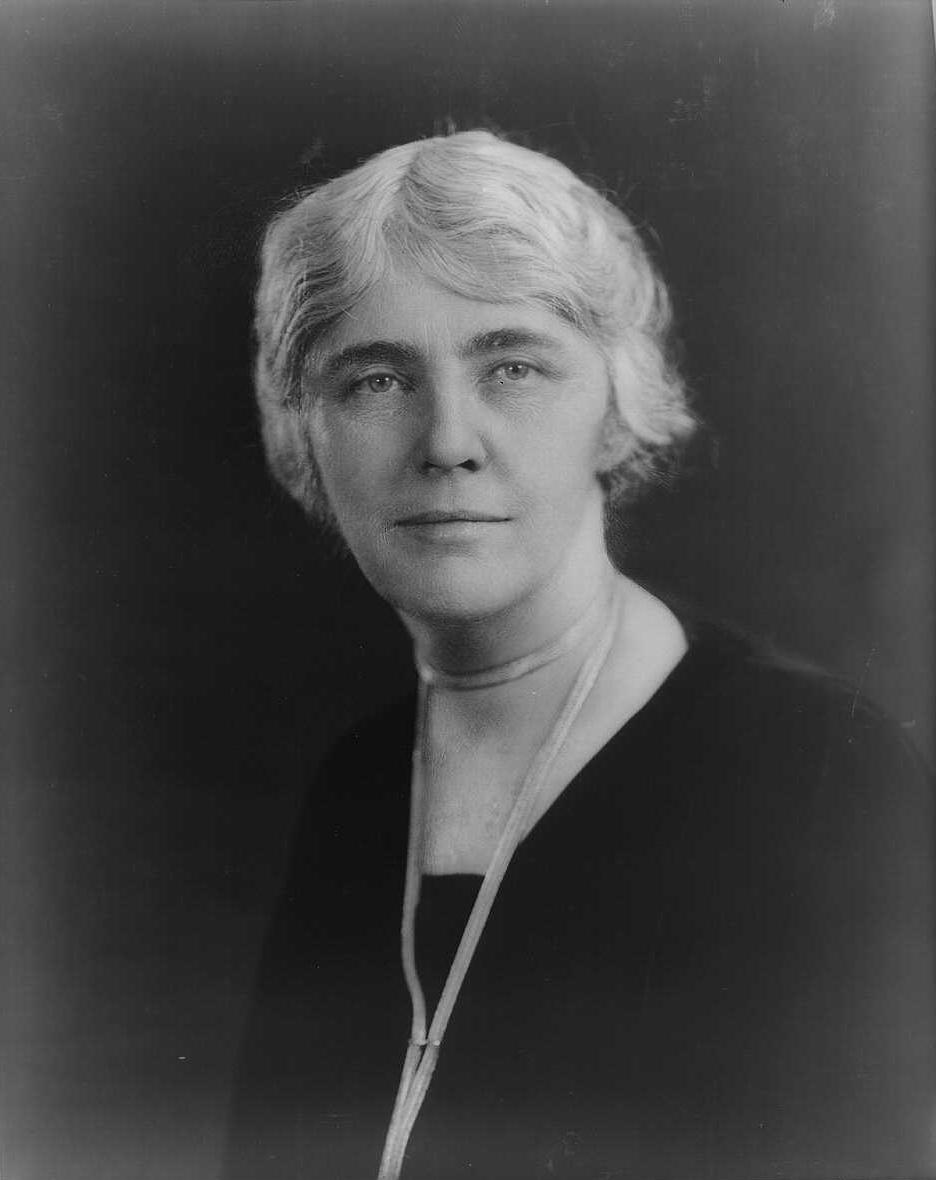
- Hoover c. 1928 – 1933

First Lady of the United States
- In role March 4, 1929 – March 4, 1933
- President: Herbert Hoover
- Preceded by: Grace Coolidge
- Succeeded by: Eleanor Roosevelt

Personal details
- Born: Lou Henry; March 29, 1874 Waterloo, Iowa, U.S.
- Died: January 7, 1944 (aged 69) New York City, U.S.
- Resting place: Herbert Hoover Presidential Library and Museum
- Party: Republican
- Spouse: Herbert Hoover (m. 1899)
- Children: Herbert; Allan
- Education: University of California, Los Angeles; San José State University (DipEd); Stanford University (BA)

Lou Henry Hoover (née Henry; March 29, 1874 – January 7, 1944) was an American philanthropist, geologist, and the first lady of the United States from 1929 to 1933 as the wife of President Herbert Hoover. She was active in community organizations and volunteer groups throughout her life, including the Girl Scouts of the USA, which she led from 1922 to 1925 and from 1935 to 1937. Throughout her life, Hoover supported women's rights and women's independence. She was a polyglot, fluent in Mandarin Chinese and well-versed in Latin, and was the primary translator from Latin to English of the complex 16th-century metallurgy text De re metallica.

Hoover was raised in California while it was part of the American frontier. She attended Stanford University, and became the first woman to receive a degree in geology from the institution. She met fellow geology student Herbert Hoover at Stanford, and they married in 1899. The Hoovers first resided in China; the Boxer Rebellion broke out later that year, and they were at the Battle of Tientsin. In 1901 they moved to London, where Hoover raised their two sons and became a popular hostess between their international travels. During World War I, the Hoovers led humanitarian efforts to assist war refugees. The family moved to Washington, D.C. in 1917, when Herbert was appointed head of the Food and Drug Administration, and Lou became a food conservation activist in support of his work.

Hoover became the First Lady of the United States when her husband was inaugurated as president in 1929. Her invitation of Jessie De Priest to the White House for tea was controversial for its implied support of racial integration and civil rights. She refused to give interviews to reporters, but she became the first first lady to give regular radio broadcasts. Hoover was responsible for refurbishing the White House during her tenure, and saw to the construction of a presidential retreat at Rapidan Camp. She minimized her public role as White House hostess, dedicating her time as first lady to her volunteer work.

Hoover's reputation declined alongside her husband's during the Great Depression as she was portrayed as uncaring of the struggles faced by Americans. Both the public and those close to her were unaware of her extensive charitable work to support the poor while serving as first lady, as she believed that publicizing generosity was improper. After Herbert lost his reelection campaign in 1932, the Hoovers returned to California, and they moved to New York City in 1940. Hoover was bitter about her husband's loss, blaming dishonest reporting and underhanded campaigning tactics, and she strongly opposed the Roosevelt administration. She worked to provide humanitarian support with her husband during World War II until her sudden death of a heart attack in 1944.

== Early life and education ==
Lou Henry, age 17, on a burro at Acton, California, on August 22, 1891

Lou Henry was born in Waterloo, Iowa, on March 29, 1874. Her mother was Florence Ida (née Weed), a former schoolteacher, and her father was Charles Delano Henry, a banker. She was the older of two daughters, raised in Waterloo before moving to Texas, Kansas, and California. Most of her childhood was spent in the California towns of Whittier and Monterey. While she was a child, her father educated her in outdoorsmanship, and she learned to camp and ride. She took up sports, including baseball, basketball, and archery. Her parents taught her other practical skills, such as bookkeeping and sewing. Her family was nominally Episcopalian, but Lou sometimes attended Quaker services.

As a child, Henry attended Bailey Street School in Whittier until 1890. She was well-liked in school, known for the science and literature clubs she organized and for her tendency to ignore gender norms by engaging in athletics and outdoor activities. When she was ten, she was the editor of her school newspaper. She began her postsecondary schooling at the Los Angeles Normal School (now the University of California, Los Angeles). While in Los Angeles, she was a member of the school's Dickens Club that studied and collected specimens of plants and animals. She later transferred to San José Normal School (now San José State University), obtaining a teaching credential in 1893. She took a serious interest in politics during her college years; she joined the Republican Party based on its progressive platform, and she strongly supported women's suffrage.

After her graduation in 1893, Henry took a job at her father's bank as well as working as a substitute teacher. The following year, she attended a lecture by geologist John Casper Branner. Fascinated by the subject, she enrolled in Branner's program at Stanford University to pursue a degree in geology. It was there that Branner introduced her to her future husband, Herbert Hoover, who was then a senior. They bonded over their shared Iowa heritage and their common interests in science and outdoorsmanship, and their friendship developed into a courtship. She studied geology with the intention of doing field work, but she and Branner were unable to find any employers willing to accept a female geologist. She maintained her interest in sports while at Stanford, serving as president of the Stanford Women's Athletic Club in her final year. In 1898, Hoover became the first woman to receive a bachelor's degree in geology from Stanford, and she was one of the first women in the United States to hold such a degree. She continued to work with Branner, conducting research on his behalf and requesting geological samples for Stanford's collection. Branner credited her with making it one of the largest collections in the world. After graduating, Henry volunteered with the Red Cross to support American soldiers during the Spanish–American War.

== Marriage and travels ==
=== Marriage and travel to China ===
In 1897, Herbert was offered an engineering job in Australia. Before leaving, he had dinner with the Henrys and their engagement was informally agreed upon. Lou and Herbert maintained a long-distance relationship while he was in Australia. Herbert was hired as chief engineer of the Chinese Engineering and Mining Company the following year, and he sent her a marriage proposal by cable, reading "Going to China via San Francisco. Will you go with me?". They were married in the Henrys' home on February 10, 1899. Lou also announced her intention to change her religious faith from Episcopalian to her husband's Quaker religion, but there was no Quaker Meeting in Monterey. Instead, they were married in a civil ceremony performed by a Spanish Roman Catholic priest.

The day after their marriage, Lou Hoover and her husband boarded a ship from San Francisco, and they briefly honeymooned at the Royal Hawaiian Hotel in Honolulu. While en route, they read extensively about China and its history. They arrived in Shanghai on March 8, spending four days in the Astor House Hotel. Hoover stayed with a missionary couple in the foreign colony in Tientsin (now Tianjin) while her husband was working, and they moved into a home of their own the following September. It was their first home as a married couple, a Western-style brick house at the edge of the colony. It was here that Hoover began homemaking and interior decoration; she managed a staff and entertained for guests. She also took up typing while in China, purchasing a typewriter and writing scientific articles on Chinese mining with her husband. Hoover worked closely with her husband, through both writing and field work. She also started a collection of Chinese porcelain that she would maintain throughout her life.

The Boxer Rebellion began while the Hoovers were in China; despite her husband's pleas, Lou refused to leave the country. As foreigners, they were both potential targets of the Boxer movement. During the Battle of Tientsin in 1900, Lou worked as a nurse and managed food supplies while Herbert organized barricades. For a month, Hoover carried a revolver while she ran supplies to soldiers on her bicycle. In one incident, a bullet struck her tire while she was riding. In another, shells struck around her home, but once it was clear the shelling was over, she calmly returned to her game of solitaire. At least one obituary was mistakenly published for her. The Hoovers left China after the end of the Boxer Rebellion that summer, traveling to London to make arrangements regarding control of Chinese mines. They returned to China once more with Lou's sister Jean for several months in 1901.

=== London and World War I ===
The Hoovers made their home in London in November 1901 after Herbert was offered a partnership with a British mining company. Their work took them throughout Europe and to many other countries, including Australia, Burma, Ceylon, Egypt, India, Japan, New Zealand, and Russia. Because of their travels, Hoover spent much of her time on steamboats. The trips were relatively comfortable, as they traveled in first class. She passed time on these months-long voyages by reading or by hosting social visits with other travelers using portable tea sets and tables. The Hoovers had two sons who accompanied them as they traveled: Herbert Hoover Jr. was born in 1903, and Allan Hoover was born in 1907.

The Hoovers became extremely wealthy after Herbert's decision to become an independent consultant in 1908. Lou's expertise in geology allowed her to participate in business talk with Herbert and his colleagues, and she thoroughly enjoyed this. The Hoovers played a role in standardizing the modern mining industry, particularly in regard to human management and business ethics. When they were in London, Lou often entertained large crowds. Their home became a social hub for their fellow expatriates and for Herbert's colleagues in the mining industry. The Hoovers engaged in philanthropy during their time in London, and Lou saw to it that her servants had their needs addressed. She joined the Friends of the Poor to work directly with people in poverty, and she joined social clubs such as the Society of American Women, the British affiliate of the General Federation of Women's Clubs; she participated in and eventually led the society's philanthropic committee.

When World War I began, the Hoovers had already spent time back in the United States and were preparing to move back permanently. Upon hearing that war had broken out, the Hoovers instead became involved with London relief efforts. When Herbert was chosen to direct relief efforts for Belgian refugees, Lou became heavily involved as well. She also reorganized the Society of American Women as a humanitarian group to facilitate the transport of Americans stranded in Britain. She traveled regularly to the United States and back to give speeches and collect donations for relief efforts, despite the danger of crossing the North Atlantic during the war. Her involvement with refugee assistance earned her a position on the American relief committee as the only female member, and she was the chairwoman of the women's American relief committee. Other projects of hers included the creation of a Red Cross hospital for British soldiers, a knitting factory in London to provide jobs for displaced women, and a maternity hospital in Belgium. As her humanitarian efforts increased, she found herself responsible for so many projects that she had to delegate several of them to other women. For her work, she was decorated in 1919 by King Albert I of Belgium.

The Hoovers returned to the United States in January 1917. When the U.S. entered World War I three months later, Herbert was appointed head of the Food and Drug Administration, and the Hoovers made their home in Washington, D.C. As with Herbert's previous endeavors, Lou worked closely alongside him. She joined her husband in promoting food conservation, traveling to give speeches promoting the cause. The Hoovers effectively became the public faces of the conservation movement. She also organized the construction of a home for her and her husband by Stanford University in Palo Alto, California, but this was seen as selfish by the public amid her humanitarian work, and she delayed the project until the end of the war. The war brought thousands of women to Washington to work as civil servants. The poor economic security of these women led Hoover to found women's groups and provide housing for the women that worked in her husband's department. She expanded her support for these women's groups to include medical treatment during the Spanish flu. Hoover paid for these programs with her own funds, describing them as loans but asking that they be repaid to someone that needed it more. After the war, Hoover continued her fundraising work in the U.S. while her husband was in Europe administrating relief efforts.

=== Cabinet member's wife ===
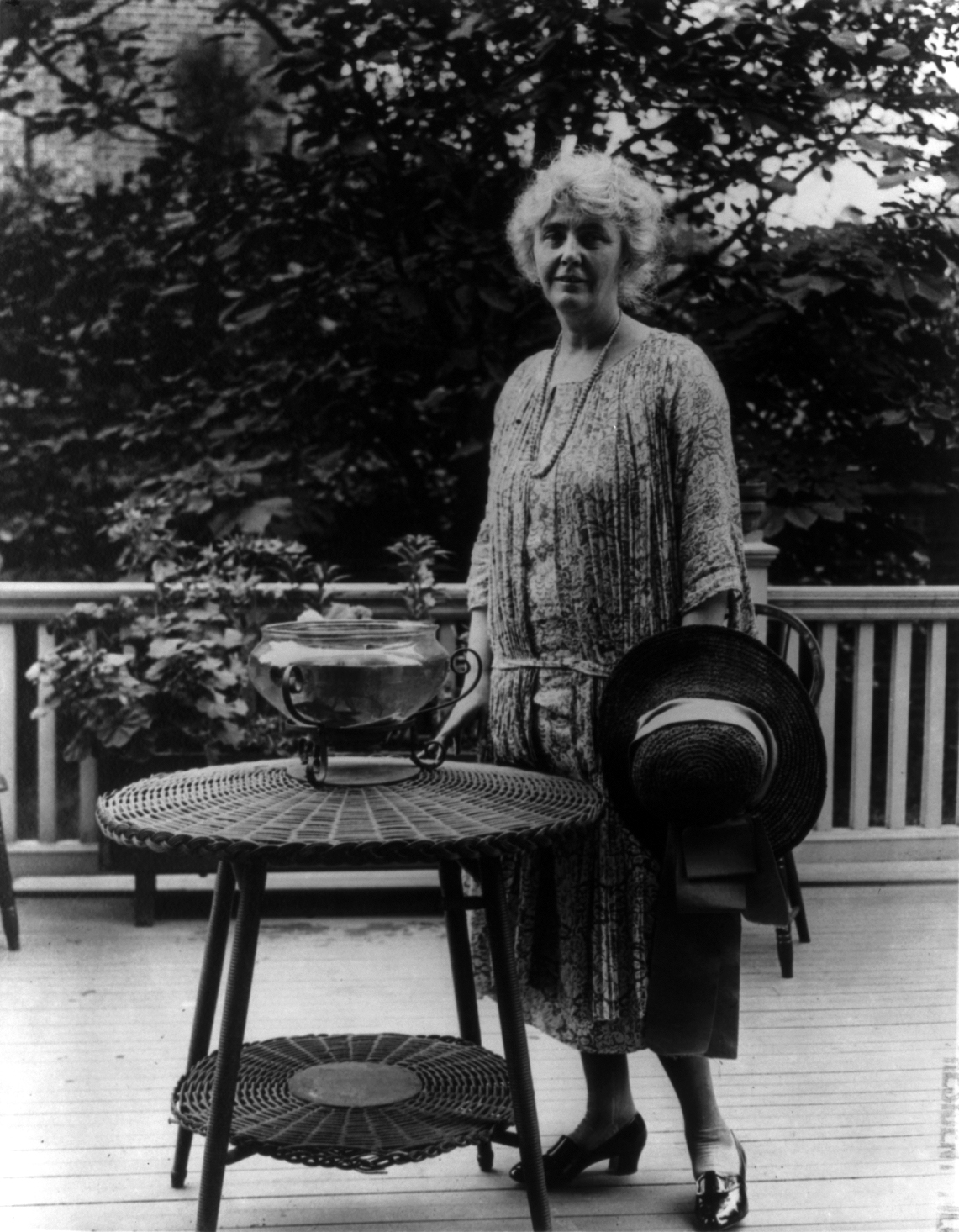
Hoover in 1926

The Hoovers returned to Washington when Herbert was appointed Secretary of Commerce in 1921. Drawing from her experience as a hostess, Hoover made their new Washington home into a social hub, allowing her husband to build relationships in the city. She found the practice of calling on her fellow cabinet wives to be a waste of time, and her refusal to do so contributed to the end of the practice. As the wife of a cabinet member, Hoover sought involvement in many women's organizations, including the Girl Scouts of the USA, the Camp Fire Girls, the General Federation of Women's Clubs, and the League of Women Voters. By the time Hoover was a cabinet wife, she emphasized a distinction between her work and her husband's, refusing to answer reporters' questions about her husband's work in Washington. When Calvin Coolidge ascended to the presidency, Hoover became close friends with the new first lady, Grace Coolidge. The two of them began a tradition of exchanging flowers on Easter, and Hoover invited Coolidge to participate in Girl Scouts events.

Hoover had begun her involvement with the Girl Scouts in 1917, wishing to continue her work with children that she had begun in her war relief efforts. She was chosen as the group's president in 1922, and she held the position until 1925. She emphasized a "lead from behind" structure for Girl Scout troops in which she recommended that troop leaders "don't forget joy". Hoover's reforms, as well as her own personal popularity, led to a significant increase in membership and funds for the organization. She convinced first lady Edith Wilson to accept a position as honorary head of the Girl Scouts, establishing a tradition that Hoover herself would eventually take on as first lady. For girls living in rural areas, she founded the Lone Scout program so they could participate without a troop in their area. She also founded racially integrated Girl Scout troops in Washington and Palo Alto.

Hoover was also heavily involved with the National Amateur Athletic Foundation, and she was the only woman to serve as vice president within the organization. She first began working with the group in 1922, and she played an active role until her husband's election as president in 1928. With this position, she created a Women's Division that outlasted the original organization. The women's division was created with the goal of moving women's sports away from the practices of men's sports, which they argued were too competitive and failed to prioritize the well-being of the athletes. Hoover believed that sports were essential for one's health and she wished to see all young girls participate in a sport. As with her participation in the Girl Scouts, she used her skill for fundraising to greatly expand the organization's resources.

When Herbert was considered as a candidate for the 1928 presidential election, Lou did not approve of active campaigning, and Herbert often refrained from political talk when she was present. Though she accompanied her husband on his campaign, she refused to comment on the election or say anything that might be considered political. The 1928 election brought more attention to the candidates' wives than those of previous years. When her husband was chosen as the Republican Party's nominee, she found herself frequently compared to Catherine Smith, the wife of Democratic nominee Al Smith. Hoover was relatively popular compared to Mrs. Smith, who was an urbanite, a Catholic, and an alleged alcoholic—all things that made her unpopular with voters. Hoover was seen as better fit for the role, being athletic and well-traveled. After Herbert was elected president, Lou accompanied him on a goodwill tour of Latin America.

== First Lady of the United States ==
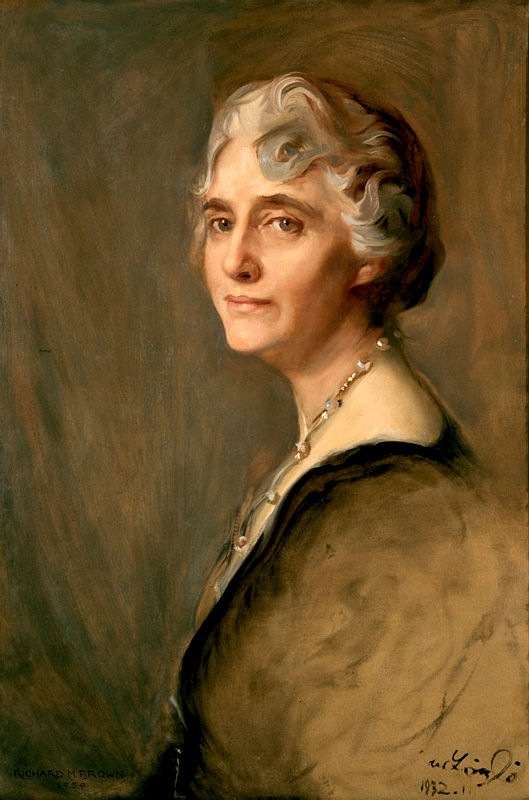
A portrait of Lou Henry Hoover by Richard Marsden Brown

=== White House hostess ===
Hoover was not as successful in her role as White House hostess as she was in other projects; she was not eager to participate in Washington society except on her own terms, and her social position became increasingly precarious as the Hoovers' reputation diminished during the Great Depression. She did not prioritize public presentations as first lady, and when she took up the role, she declined to purchase new clothes or learn any new skills as incoming first ladies often did. She was often reclusive, ending the practice of greeting thousands of people during the New Year's Day reception because she deemed it unpleasant. Her husband later said that it was only her "rigid sense of duty" that prevented her from abolishing other receptions as well. She made sure to accommodate pregnant women, rejecting the social expectation of the time that pregnancy not be visible in public.

Hoover was more willing to invite individual guests to the White House, and such guests were present at every meal. Some days included additional teas to accommodate the constant flow of guests to the White House. On several occasions, White House staff found that due to last-minute invitations, they had to prepare and serve meals for several times as many people as originally expected. Unlike previous first ladies, Hoover emphasized political advantage when selecting guests, setting a precedent for future first ladies. At the beginning of her tenure, Hoover spent large sums of money to ensure that the White House had "the best of everything", using all of the funds allocated by Congress and then supplementing it with the family's personal funds. She expressed her love of music by inviting several renowned musicians to the White House, and she introduced the tradition of inviting a guest musician to play for visiting foreign leaders after she had her friend Mildred Dilling play for the King of Siam. The Great Depression brought an end to the White House's more extravagant social events as Hoover reduced her spending to serve as an example for the American people.

When African American candidate Oscar Stanton De Priest was elected to Congress, Hoover initiated a meeting for tea at the White House with his wife Jessie De Priest, as was tradition for the wives of all incoming Congressmen. Hoover was responsible for planning the event to ensure its success. She arranged the scheduling so that only women she trusted would attend, and she alerted White House security that Mrs. De Priest was to be expected and not barred entry. Hoover chose not to publicize the details of De Priest's attendance until after it occurred so as to avoid interruptions. The event became part of a larger debate on racial issues as Southern voters protested the invitation of a Black woman. It further complicated Hoover's relationship with the press, as she deemed Southern newspapers to be responsible for the criticism. The Hoovers reinforced the precedent by inviting other non-white musicians to play at the White House, including the Tuskegee Institute Choir.

=== Management of the White House ===
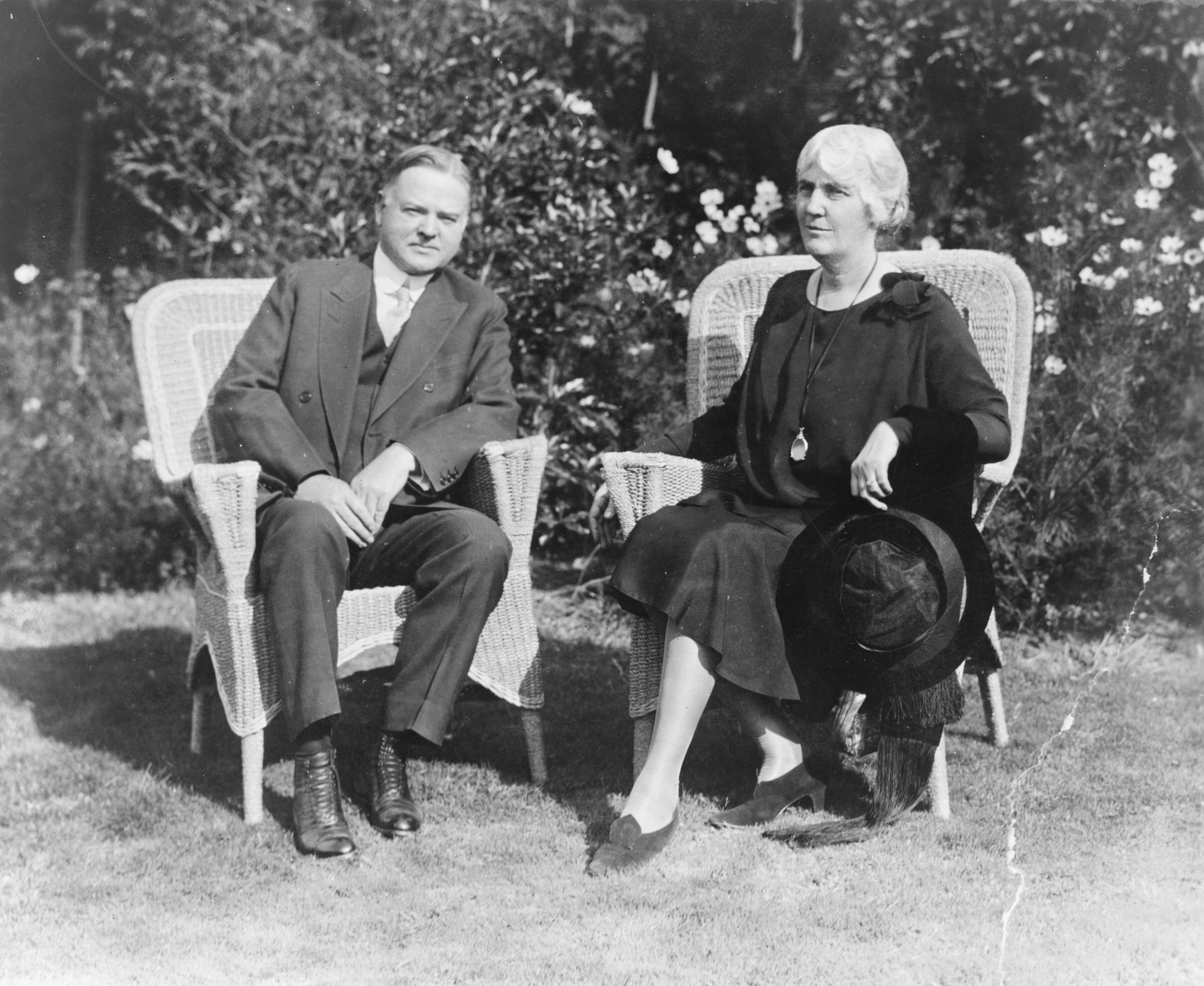
The Hoovers in 1929

During her time as first lady, Hoover oversaw refurbishing of the White House, importing art and furniture to decorate the building. She worked in conjunction with a committee that had been formed in the previous administration to decorate the White House, though she sometimes declined to consult them and made her own changes. She hired her own assistant at personal expense to catalogue what already existed in the White House, creating the first full compilation for the history of the White House's furnishings. Her refurbishments included the reconstruction of the studies of Abraham Lincoln and James Monroe, which would later be converted into the Lincoln Bedroom and the Treaty Room, respectively. She also had a movie projector installed in the White House. Hoover's many projects meant that she frequently held meetings of her own in the White House, and she had bedrooms converted into sitting rooms so she and the president could both see several people each day.

Hoover played a critical role in designing and overseeing the construction of a rustic presidential retreat at Rapidan Camp in Madison County, Virginia now within the boundaries of Shenandoah National Park. After the location was chosen, the Hoovers discovered the poverty in the area and added the construction of a school building to their project. Once Rapidan Camp was established as a second presidential home, the Hoovers stayed there each weekend. Hoover often practiced horseback riding while at the camp, where she often outpaced the military horsemen that accompanied her. The Hoovers undertook another philanthropic construction project in 1930 to build a Quaker Meeting House in Washington D.C.

The Hoovers' relationship with their staff is the subject of debate. Memoirs of staff members have portrayed them in a negative light, but it is unclear how much of this depiction originates from the books' ghostwriters. Hoover required the staff to remain out of sight, and a bell would be rung before she or her husband entered a room, signaling for the staff to leave the area. While managing White House events, she would use hand signals to communicate with the staff. Many innocuous gestures, such as raising a finger or dropping a handkerchief, indicated a command for them to follow. Even slight deviations from expected behavior, such as scraping plates or breaking composure when standing during mealtimes, risked a rebuke. Though she was strict, she also treated the staff generously, frequently paying for their food and other personal expenses. Besides the White House staff, Hoover had her own personal first lady staff. She had four women working directly for her, more than any previous first lady.

=== Politics and activism ===
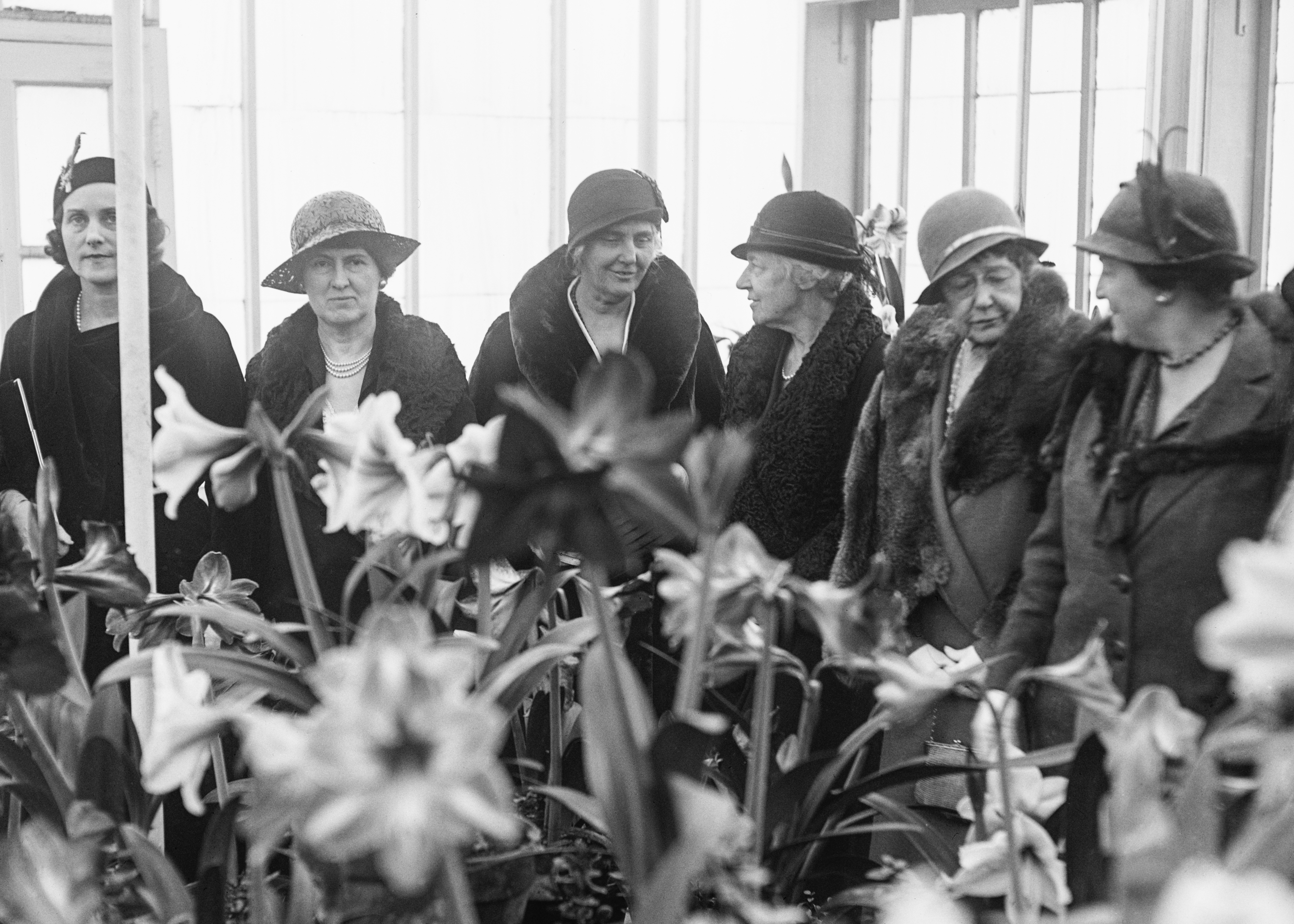
Hoover (third from left) with the wives of cabinet members in 1932

Hoover was her husband's frequent adviser while he was president. Throughout her tenure, she refused to give interviews to the press, seeing them as intrusive and error-prone. Instead, she spoke to the public by giving speeches over the radio, and she was the first woman to make radio broadcasts as first lady. She took pride in her broadcasts, rehearsing them in a dedicated room and practicing her speaking technique. These broadcasts often used plain language and advocated feminist ideals. Hoover continued her involvement with volunteer and activist work, though much of it was reduced or ignored in favor of her responsibilities as first lady. She remained directly active with the Girl Scouts, continuing her oversight of its organizational and financial operations, and she touted it as an example of the volunteerism she felt was necessary to combat the Great Depression. Hoover also became a patron of the arts as first lady, particularly in her support of aspiring musicians. Using her influence as first lady, Hoover encouraged her husband to hire more women in his administration, and she expressed support for an executive order to ban sex discrimination in civil service appointments. She generally avoided any strong political statements or affiliations that might have interfered with her husband's administration.

During the Great Depression, Hoover regularly received requests for assistance from citizens who were struggling. She referred each one to a local charity organization or a person who could help so that each would get the needed assistance. Whenever she was unable to find a charity or a donor that could help, she sent her own money. She refused to publicize or draw attention to her charitable work, consistent with her lifelong belief that private generosity should not be promotional. Often she sent the money anonymously through a proxy so her name would not be associated with it. She also became responsible for the financial situation of her and her husband's relatives and family friends. Serving as a point of contact between her husband and those suffering poverty, she presented an image of empathy to contrast with the president's perceived aloofness. Hoover also helped organize fundraiser concerts for the American Red Cross with pianist Ignacy Jan Paderewski. She was deeply affected by the criticisms leveled against her husband during the Great Depression, furious that a man whom she saw as caring and charitable was being criticized as the opposite. In support of her husband's stance on the economy, her radio broadcasts during the Great Depression focused on volunteerism, emphasizing women's role in volunteer work. She accompanied her husband on a presidential campaign again in 1932, but he was defeated in the 1932 presidential election.

== Later life and death ==
After leaving the White House, the Hoovers took their first true vacation in many years, driving through the Western United States. Hoover continued to receive letters requesting assistance, though far fewer than she had addressed while serving as first lady. She did not share her husband's desire to return to politics, but she was active in Republican Party women's groups. In 1935, she took up a project to purchase and restore her husband's birthplace cottage in Iowa. She also returned to the Girl Scouts the same year to serve as its president for another year. Hoover became involved with the Salvation Army to support its fundraising operations in 1937. The same year, she returned to Stanford University to develop the Friends of Music program, with which she was active for the rest of her life. She also supported a physical therapy program that she hoped would prove beneficial should the United States go to war. She maintained an active lifestyle throughout her later years, including a weeks-long horseback tour of the Cascade Range while she was in her sixties.

Hoover disapproved of the actions of the Roosevelt administration, and she became affiliated with the Pro-America movement that opposed the New Deal. At the onset of World War II, she once again worked to provide relief for war refugees with her husband, reminiscent of their work in World War I. She was enraged by the Japanese invasion of China, a place with which she always felt a personal connection. Despite this, she took an isolationist stance, hoping that the U.S. would not enter the second World War as it had entered the first. During the 1940 presidential election, the Hoovers campaigned on behalf of Republican candidate Wendell Willkie. They moved to New York in December 1940, as Herbert had been spending an increasing amount of time there on business.

Hoover died of a heart attack on January 7, 1944, while staying at the Waldorf Astoria New York. She was found by her husband when he returned to their room. Two services were held for her. The first, a joint Episcopalian-Quaker service in New York, was attended by about one thousand people, including two hundred girl scouts. The second was held in Palo Alto, where she was buried. After her death, her family found many checks she had received to repay her for her charity but which she had declined to cash. She was later reinterred in her husband's grave in West Branch, Iowa.

== Political beliefs ==
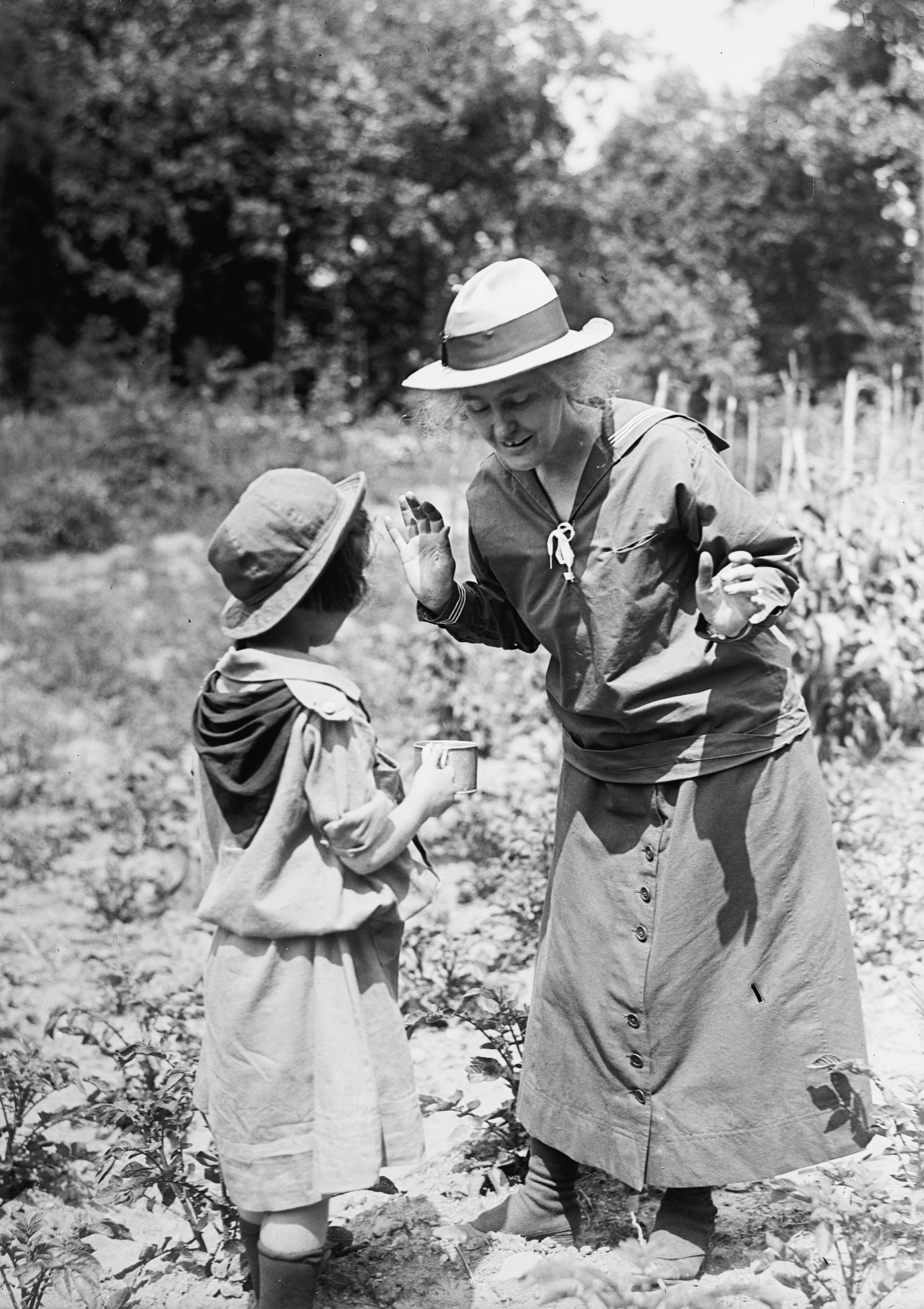
Hoover working with a girl scout

During her early life and career, Hoover was not politically vocal. She preferred to speak to nonpartisan issues, and she wished to avoid saying anything that might have political ramifications for her husband. To present a unified stance with her husband, she rarely expressed political ideas of her own except on women's issues. Hoover supported civil rights and deplored racism, though she was susceptible to the racial stereotyping that was common at the time, and she was unaware of problems faced by the African American community. One of the few issues on which she disagreed with her husband was her support for the prohibition of alcohol. She disposed of her husband's wine collection, and she refused to attend any event that served alcohol illegally.

Throughout her life, Hoover worked to support women's causes. She was an advocate of women's employment, encouraging housewives to start careers as well as keeping house. Her support for women's causes came about early in life, and she wrote school essays on the subject. She was a member of several women's groups, many of which engaged in philanthropic efforts to support women. When the Nineteenth Amendment guaranteed women's suffrage in the United States in 1920, Hoover said that women's responsibilities extended to civic duty. She chastised women who lived purely domestic lives as "lazy", arguing that household chores did not preclude a career. She was also critical of politically active women who focused exclusively on women's and children's rights issues, believing that women should participate in governance more broadly.

Hoover was a strong believer in philanthropy and business ethics, supporting her husband's decision to reimburse his employees at personal expense after a fellow partner defrauded them. She also ensured that the culprit's family was cared for financially after he fled the country. She believed that private charity was preferable to public assistance programs. Hoover was not vocal about her beliefs on philanthropy, believing that it was something that should be practiced privately. She opposed publicized philanthropy, and she gave funds to the needy throughout her life without telling others. The full extent of her philanthropy was not known until records were discovered after her death. She held a similar philosophy regarding religion, believing that practice was more important than sectarian identification.

While her husband was the head of the Food and Drug Administration, Hoover took up the cause of food conservation. She began a tradition of leaving one chair empty as a reminder of child starvation whenever she entertained company. In 1918, she invited reporters into her home for a special "Dining with the Hoovers" interview in which she detailed their household's dining habits and conservation strategies. The practice of self-imposed dietary restrictions to conserve, such as going one day a week without meat, became known as "Hoovering". She provided lessons and recipes for Americans that wished to grow or prepare their own food.

Amid the corruption of the Teapot Dome scandal, Hoover took an active stance in favor of government accountability. The scandal led her to call for more women in law enforcement, and she headed the Women's Conference on Law Enforcement in 1924. As first lady, Hoover provided indirect support to disabled veterans of the Bonus Army, though she believed that the able-bodied veterans had no claim to the additional support they were requesting. She was highly sensitive to political criticism as first lady, and she was strongly affected by remarks against her husband's presidency. Hoover became more conservative after her tenure as first lady, and she was critical of the Roosevelt administration. Hoover had a low opinion of the Roosevelts, believing that they caused her husband to be politically smeared and cost him a second term in the White House. She also felt that many of President Roosevelt's actions were unconstitutional. Later in life, she made political statements deploring the spread of communism and fascism.

== Languages ==
Hoover spoke five languages by the time she became first lady. She began her study of Mandarin Chinese while on the ship to China after her marriage. She took up instruction under a Chinese Christian scholar, eventually surpassing him in the Chinese vocabulary. She sometimes served as her husband's translator while they lived in China, and she would continue to practice Chinese with him afterward so that he would retain the little that he knew. When she wished to speak privately with her husband in the White House, Hoover would engage with him in Mandarin. Her Chinese name was 'Hoo Loo' (古鹿; Pinyin: Gǔ Lù【胡潞，Hú Lù】), derived from the sound of her name in English.

Hoover was also well versed in Latin, which she studied while at Stanford. She collaborated with her husband in translating Georgius Agricola's De re metallica, a 16th-century encyclopedia of mining and metallurgy. Lou was responsible for the translation from the Latin, while Herbert applied his knowledge of the subject matter and carried out physical experiments based on what they discerned from the text. The book had previously been considered unusable due to the difficulty of translating its technical language, some of which had been invented by its author. After its translation, the Hoovers published it at their own expense and donated copies to students and experts of mining. In recognition of their work, they received the gold medal of the Mining and Metallurgical Society of America in 1914. They dedicated the book to Dr. Branner, the instructor who had introduced Lou to geology and to Herbert.

== Legacy ==
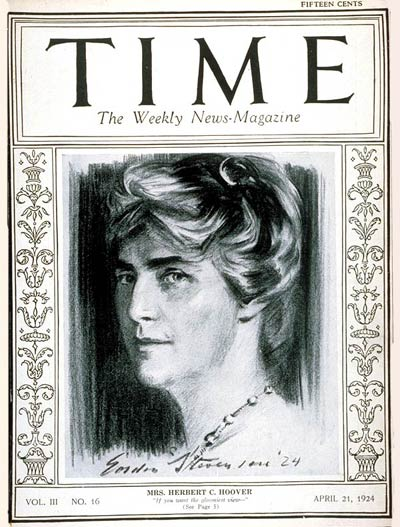
Time cover, April 21, 1924

During her tenure as first lady, Hoover was variously seen as a homemaker, as was common for first ladies, and as an activist. Her reputation, along with that of her husband, languished as the Hoover administration was criticized for its response to the Great Depression. Hoover is often seen as a counterbalance to her husband as she took up the social responsibilities of their work in and out of the White House, her charisma and tact balancing his reputation of being shy and sometimes arrogant. She has since been consistently ranked in the upper half of first ladies in periodic polling of historians.

Hoover set an early precedent for the political role of first ladies in the 20th century by expressing an interest in women's issues and supporting her husband's platform with her own projects. Despite their political differences, Hoover has been compared to her successor Eleanor Roosevelt in their common approaches to political engagement and women's issues. Hoover's use of radio broadcasts proved similar to her successor's own use of media over the following years.

The first biography about Hoover was Lou Henry Hoover: Gallant First Lady, written by her friend Helen B. Pryor in 1969. Her husband requested that her papers remained sealed for twenty years after his own death, preventing any significant scholarly analysis of her life or her role as first lady until then. They were opened in 1985, allowing for increased scholarship on her life and her work. Her papers are relatively comprehensive for historical figures of the period, including over 220,000 items and encompassing every period of her life. Historical study of Hoover has been complicated by her private nature, as she would often refuse media attention and burn personal letters.

The Stanford home that Hoover designed was donated to the university by her husband, who requested that it be named the Lou Henry Hoover House. Two elementary schools were named in her honor: Lou Henry Hoover Elementary School of Whittier, California, in 1938 and Lou Henry Elementary School of Waterloo, Iowa, in 2005. Lou Henry Hoover Memorial Hall was built in 1948 at Whittier College. One of the brick dormitories at San Jose State University was named "Hoover Hall" in her honor until its demolition in 2016. Camp Lou Henry Hoover in Middleville, New Jersey, is named for her.

In May 2017, the Lou Henry Hoover Sculpture Park was dedicated in Waterloo, Iowa on the site of her torn down birthplace home. There are two statues of her in the Sculpture Park, one of her as a child & young lady and one of her as First Lady.

== See also ==
- Margaret Hoover – Hoover's great-granddaughter

== Notes ==
Awards and achievements
| Preceded by George Baker | Cover of Time; April 21, 1924 | Succeeded by Gelasio Caetani |
Honorary titles
| Preceded by Grace Coolidge | First Lady of the United States; 1929–1933 | Succeeded by Eleanor Roosevelt |
