= A Guest of Honor (opera) =

Lost opera by Scott Joplin

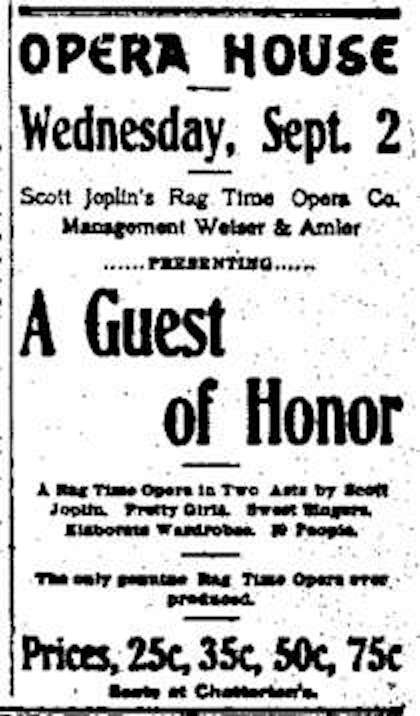
1903 Advertising poster for A Guest of Honor by Scott Joplin

A Guest of Honor (ISJ 54) is the first opera created by celebrated ragtime composer Scott Joplin in 1903. The opera had two acts, is based on the model of grand opera, and followed the events surrounding the 1901 White House dinner hosted by President Theodore Roosevelt for the civil rights leader and educator Booker T. Washington.

== History ==
Joplin is believed to have begun writing A Guest of Honor shortly after Washington's visit to Roosevelt's White House. A copyright application was filed on February 16, 1903, with the Library of Congress. Joplin did not include a copy of the score with the application, but did list Stark Publishing on the application. It is theorized that he intended to have the score published prior to the copyright submission, but this never happened despite the application.

In April 1903, an informal public presentation of the opera was reviewed by Monroe Rosenfeld of the St. Louis Globe-Democrat. The performance had taken place "In a large hall where they often gave dances," Rosenfeld noting the company's daily rehearsals at the Crawford's Theatre in Louisiana (now Gayety Theatre). He also noted the opera's financial backing, and noted the opera's premiere date as August 30 of 1903.

Joplin later created an opera company called the "Scott Joplin's Ragtime Opera Company" (Note: The group was also called a minstrel group at times.) of about 30-32 people to take A Guest of Honor for a national tour. It is not certain how many productions were actually staged, or even if this was an all-black show or a racially mixed presentation (which would have been very unusual for 1903). He later took the company on tour in August 1903, continuing into October. The tour was ostensibly scheduled for 15 stops, although how many were fulfilled is unknown.

During the tour, either in Springfield, Illinois, or Pittsburg, Kansas, someone associated with the company stole the box office receipts. Joplin could not meet the company's payroll or pay for the company's lodgings at a theatrical boarding house. It is believed the score for A Guest of Honor was confiscated with Joplin's belongings, due to non-payment of his bills. Joplin later traveled to New York in 1907 in order to find financial support and a publisher for the opera, but did not manage to find support. Overall, it is reported that the tour was a financial failure for Joplin, although from 1907 onward, Joplin was again busy working on his second opera, Treemonisha. Scholar Edward Berlin's research noted Joplin's readiness to leave his first opera behind:

I have not discovered a single reference to the opera after 1903. Whereas from 1907 on, Joplin rarely missed an opportunity to mention he was working on an opera (which was to be Treemonisha), or, from 1911, that he had completed it, he never cites it as his second opera. It is as if he wanted to pretend A Guest of Honor had never existed.

— Edward Berlin, Chapter 10: "A Guest of Honor, 1903," from King of Ragtime: Scott Joplin and His Era (2016, 2nd Edn.)

To date, no copy of the score to A Guest of Honor has ever surfaced, and it is considered lost. However, a card dating from March 27 of 1906 noted that two copies due to be received by the Copyright Office did not come. Later confirmation from William P. Stark, son of John Stillwell Stark, noted the overall weakness of the opera, "While A Guest of Honor had some pretty good music, the story and lyrics were weak, and it was never published."

== Details ==
Joplin had dedicated his first opera to Pharaoh T. Bowles, a resident of Missouri.

The title of the opera, "A Guest of Honor," was used verbatim in an editorial dating to September 12, 1901, from the Indianapolis Freeman. It is known that Joplin was an avid reader of the journal.
