= Jessie De Priest =

American music teacher and congressional spouse (1870–1961)

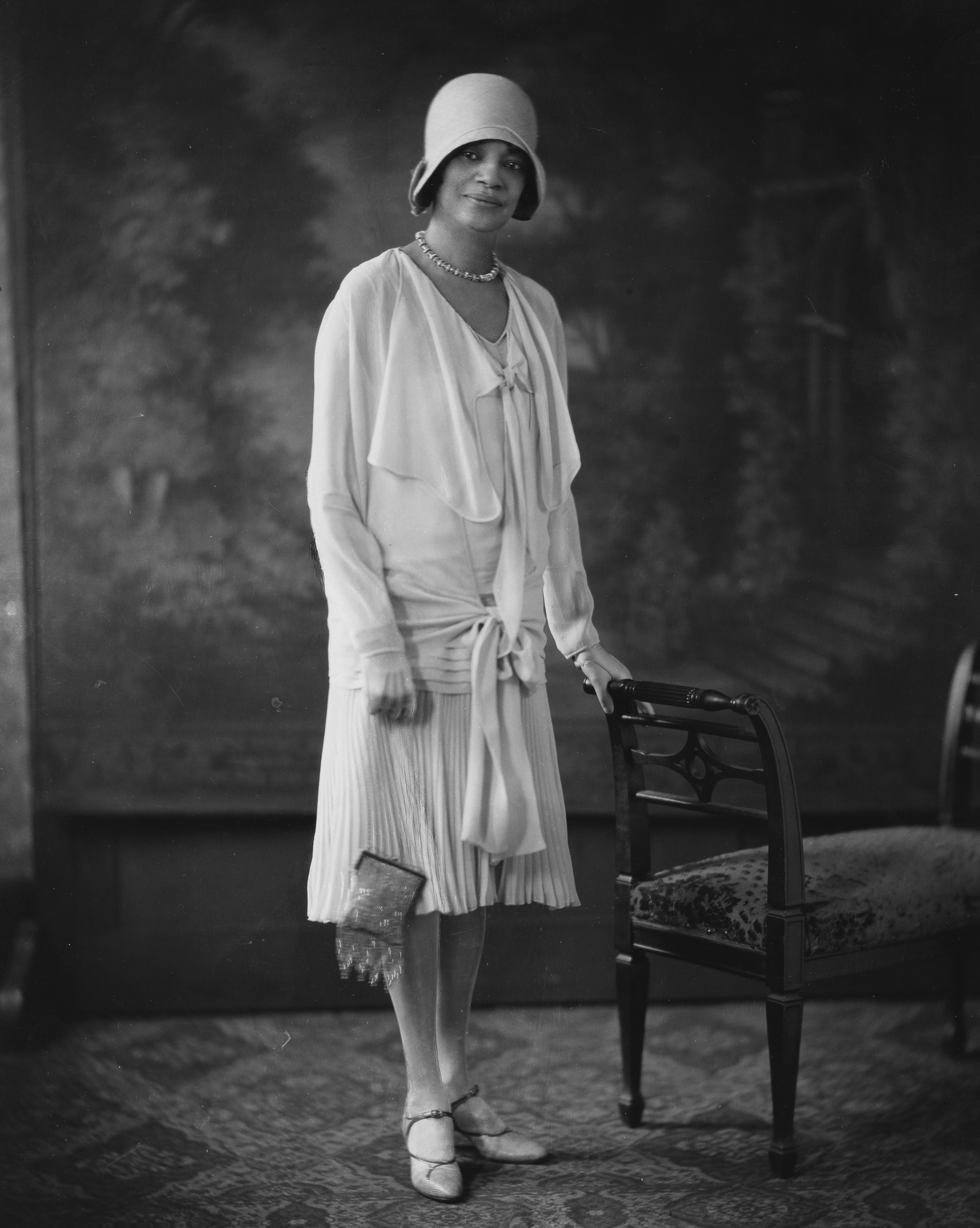
- De Priest on June 12, 1929, during the "Tea Incident", taken by Addison N. Scurlock
- Born: Jessie Williams; September 3, 1870; Rockford, Illinois, U.S.
- Died: March 31, 1961 (aged 90)
- Resting place: Graceland Cemetery
- Occupations: Congressional spouse, music teacher
- Known for: Tea at the White House incident
- Spouse: Oscar Stanton De Priest (m. 1898; died 1951)
- Children: 2

Jessie De Priest (née Williams; September 3, 1870 – March 31, 1961) was an American music teacher who was married to Oscar Stanton De Priest, the first African American to be elected to the United States Congress in the 20th century. Jessie De Priest was the first African-American wife of a U.S. congressman elected in the 1900s. She is best known for her involvement in an incident known as the "Tea at the White House". First Lady Lou Henry Hoover invited De Priest to the traditional tea along with several other congressmen's wives, resulting in racist backlash from media outlets and the public.

== Personal life ==
=== Family and career ===
Little is known about Jessie De Priest's early life. She was born Jessie Williams in Rockford, Illinois, on September 3, 1870, one of four daughters. Her parents, Mary Ann Scott and James Williams, were from Pennsylvania. Mary Ann "Emma" Williams was recorded as a mulatto housewife in the 1880 U.S. Federal Census records, while James Williams was recorded as a white barber. The Williams daughters were also recorded as mulatto in the 1880 Census. Her father James W. Williams served in the 47th Regiment of the U.S. Colored Troops during the Civil War.

Before marrying Oscar De Priest, Jessie worked as a music teacher in Rockford.

=== Marriage and children ===
Jessie Williams married Oscar Stanton De Priest on February 23, 1898, in Rockford, Illinois. The De Priests had two children, Laurence (c. 1900 – July 28, 1916) and Oscar Stanton Jr. (May 24, 1906 – November 8, 1983). The elder son, Laurence, died in a drowning accident at age 16. Oscar Jr. lived a full life with children and named a son Oscar Stanton De Priest III after his father, the congressman.

=== Residences ===
Emma and James Williams moved from Pennsylvania to Rockford, Illinois, in Winnebago County shortly after the end of the Civil War in 1865. By 1904, after her marriage to Oscar, Jessie De Priest and her family were living in Cook County, Illinois, where her second son was born.

In 1929, De Priest moved from Chicago, Illinois, to 419 U Street NW, Washington, D.C., with her husband Oscar. The De Priests remained at this address throughout Oscar's three terms in Congress.

After seven years, De Priest returned to Cook County, to the second floor of an apartment building at 4536–4538 South Dr. Martin Luther King, Jr., Drive (then South Grand Boulevard). Designated a National Historic Landmark in 1975, this building is known as the Oscar Stanton De Priest House.

De Priest resided in Chicago, Cook County, Illinois, for the remainder of her life, and her final resting place is a family plot in a rural area of the city.

== Tea at the White House ==
=== Background ===
==== Politics ====
Jessie De Priest's husband, Oscar, represented the Illinois Republican Party as a U.S. Representative to Congress under Herbert Hoover as President. In addition to being the only Black representative to serve during his three terms, he was the first Black Congressman elected in a state outside the South. Both Jessie and Oscar De Priest were strong advocates for anti-lynching legislation, which never passed.

==== Jessie De Priest public image ====
As seen in professional photographs taken during the De Priests' congressional years, Jessie De Priest was well-dressed and attuned to the fashion of the time. Her elegant self-presentation was seen as countering negative visual stereotypes of Black Americans in the media. This visual carried over to De Priest's mannerisms and interactions as well. When recalling conversations with De Priest, acquaintances described her as attentive, gracious, and well-educated.

=== First Lady Lou Hoover's invitation ===
On Wednesday, June 5, 1929, Jessie De Priest received a handwritten invitation requesting her attendance at a traditional tea hosted by First Lady Lou Hoover for the spouses of Congressmen. The tea was scheduled for 4 p.m. the following Wednesday. Hoover chose to deliver the invitation to De Priest in secrecy so close to the event date to avoid boycotting of the four earlier scheduled Congressional teas by Southerners angry with the presence of a Black woman in the White House. The event and guest list were carefully planned to avoid embarrassment of the Hoovers or the De Priests during the tea and to avoid political fallout from citizens and representatives holding beliefs of white superiority.

=== Event ===
On the day of the Congressional tea, June 12, 1929, Jessie De Priest was described by Time magazine as "wearing an afternoon dress of Capri blue chiffon, a grey coat trimmed in moleskin, a small grey hat, moonlight grey hose, [and] snakeskin slippers." Guests were served tea, sandwiches, cake, and punch, while conversing with one another in an intimate setting. The group of women invited were those whose views on racial politics were known and were ensured to be hospitable toward De Priest. They consisted of spouses of Cabinet members and Congressional wives from New York, Pennsylvania, and California, as well as Lou Hoover's sister and secretary.

=== Controversy ===
Historians emphasize different aspects of Lou Hoover's decision to invite Jessie De Priest to the White House tea.

Several accounts cast Lou Hoover as an activist First Lady, inviting De Priest because she would not entertain the notion of excluding De Priest due to a belief in fairness and equality, and celebrate the planning on the part of Hoover and her aides to avoid any potential embarrassment or ridicule to De Priest during the tea.

Other sources note that Lou Hoover initially left De Priest off the guest list for several teas with Republican Congress representatives' wives, and it was only after Oscar De Priest publicized the slight that Hoover invited De Priest to the final of a series of five White House teas. Evidenced by the written correspondence between aides of First Lady Hoover and President Hoover regarding the potential attendance of De Priest, consideration was given to political implications of the invitation. The guest list for the tea at which De Priest was eventually present was carefully vetted to ensure each of the 14 other women would not create a scene over socializing with a Black woman. It was substantially smaller than the four other teas, after 180 to 220 women were invited to attend each of these prior events.

=== Media portrayal ===
==== Mixed reception ====
Letters found in the documents in the Herbert Hoover Presidential Library and Museum show a mixture of positive and negative reactions to First Lady Hoover's invitation of Jessie De Priest to the White House tea. One critical letter to the president says: "Just because the Republican Party is in power does not make it right to attempt to force such an abhorrently low standard of social appraisement of our [White] race down our throats." A citizen with an opposing view wrote, "The reception of Mrs. Oscar De Priest, at the White House by Mrs. Hoover, is a great victory for the principles, of social, and political equality of all races, upon which this nation was founded." Several more letters are on record from both citizens and government officials supporting each of the two contrasting viewpoints.

Southern officials and media outlets had a predominantly negative view of De Priest dining with the First Lady in the White House. Democratic Senators Simmons and Overman of North Carolina called the event unfortunate and stressed that it was a threat to social stability and approval in the Southern United States. Texas Senator Sheppard was even more overt in his criticism, stating this was "recognition of social equality between the white and black races and is fraught with infinite danger to our white civilization."

In response to the backlash and criticism, the Hoover administration asserted this was an official rather than a social function as a means of minimizing the event. The White House was wary of potential political losses in both the North and South.

However, there was also support for De Priest's presence at the White House. She was one of the first African Americans to be invited socially to the White House since Booker T. Washington dined with the Roosevelt family. Black people throughout the U.S. celebrated the tea at the White House as a victory and African American-run news outlets published articles promoting the story of De Priest's attendance. Oscar De Priest capitalized on the publicity as well, hosting a successful fundraiser for the National Association for the Advancement of Colored People (NAACP). The Hoovers also received praise for inviting Jessie De Priest to the White House from, among others, the Chicago City Council, the Women's International League for Peace and Freedom, the International Club of Detroit, and an editorial in The Nation.

==== Jessie De Priest's words ====
In De Priest's eyes, the event itself was a pleasant and uneventful one. The Chicago Tribune published an article on July 17, 1929, recounting De Priest's sharing her experience with a group of 300 women in the Pilgrim Baptist Church. Under the headline "White House Lady is Most Charming, Mrs. De Priest Says", the article goes on to explain De Priest "found Mrs. Hoover a most charming woman— a cosmopolite". De Priest specified that there was "no excitement" upon her entering the White House and she spoke to the other women present about problems as equals. In fact, De Priest said, "All the storm of criticism has been stirred up since— outside the capital, mostly below the Mason and Dixon line," emphasizing it was not a controversial event until critical media portrayals from the South made it so.

== Other events ==
During the time Jessie De Priest and her family were living in Washington, D.C., social clubs on Capitol Hill were hesitant to grant membership to Black members of Congress and their families. One of these groups was The Congressional Club, made up of spouses and daughters of high level federal government officials. The club considered revising their bylaws to refuse access to Jessie De Priest, but eventually decided against the change when faced with "national scrutiny".

== Last years and death ==
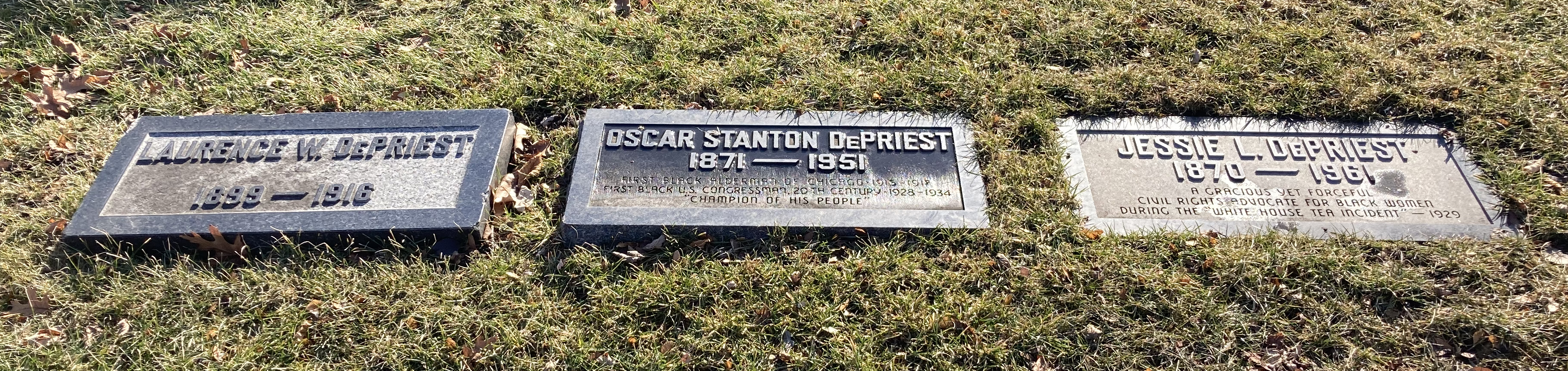
De Priest's grave at Graceland Cemetery

De Priest lived for 10 years after her husband died as the result of complications after a bus accident. She died on March 31, 1961, following a stroke. The final resting site of Jessie De Priest is in Graceland Cemetery in Chicago, Illinois, USA. This is the same cemetery in which her husband, Oscar Stanton De Priest, and one of her sons, Laurence De Priest, are buried.

== Legacy ==
As of 2012, Jessie De Priest's great-grandson, Philip R. DePriest, has worked to preserve the apartment his great-grandparents owned in Chicago. He was designated the administrator of the National Historic Monument and referred to the political documents found in a locked safe as a "veritable treasure trove".

In an interview discussing Jessie De Priest's character and reputation, her great‑grandson characterized De Priest as "reserved", saying unfortunately little was known of her personality beyond her being gracious and well-groomed, even within the De Priest family. He did, however, share an anecdote of De Priest's considerate nature. She always insisted on sending a plate of food out to the driver, Henry, when she and her husband were chauffeured to family dinners on Sunday nights.

== See also ==
- Jessie De Priest tea at the White House
- Oscar Stanton De Priest
- Oscar Stanton De Priest House
- Lou Henry Hoover
- Racism in the United States
