= Joseph Bunel =

Haitian plantation manager and diplomat

Joseph R. E. Bunel was a representative of the Haitian Revolutionary Government, who negotiated the first trade agreement between his nation and the United States, in 1799.

== Biography ==
Born in France, he became a merchant and plantation manager in Cap-Français, Saint-Domingue (now Cap-Haïtien, Haiti). Although white and a slave-holder, his wife, Marie Fanchette Estève, was a free-black Creole, and he was sympathetic to the 1791 Haitian Revolution through which the former-colony won its independence from France. He served as a diplomatic and trade envoy for Governor Toussaint Louverture, a self-educated former slave. He did the same for Louverture's successor, Jean-Jacques Dessalines.

He played an important administrative role in Louverture's regime, drafting trade and non-aggression agreements between Saint-Domingue and the United States and Great Britain. Louverture trusted Bunel enough to make him the country's Paymaster General.

=== United States ===
In July 1798, the United States rescinded its treaties with France, beginning two years of low-level conflict known as the Quasi-War. L'Ouverture saw this breach as an opportunity.

In early-December 1798, Bunel came to Philadelphia, Pennsylvania, then the capital of the United States, to try to end the American trade embargo against Saint-Domingue. He met and dined with Secretary of State Timothy Pickering, and was invited to meet President John Adams. In early-January 1799, he dined with Adams.

Debate in Congress over "Toussaint's Clause" focused on the consequences of legitimizing a revolutionary government run by former-slaves, and how American slave-holders would be endangered by interaction between their slaves and Saint-Dominguans. Pennsylvania Congressman Albert Gallatin appealed to racial prejudice in his notorious "Black Speech" (January 21, 1799), using Bunel (who had brought his wife with him) as an example of miscegenation taking place in Philadelphia:

The General [L'Ouverture] is black, and his agent here is married to a black woman in this city.

Congress passed "Toussaint's Clause," and the Bunels returned to Saint-Domingue in mid-February.

The United States did not officially recognize the Haitian Revolutionary Government, but the trade agreement was announced by a June 26, 1799 presidential proclamation: U.S. Proclamation Regarding Commerce with St. Domingo (1799).

Following Jefferson's 1800 election as president, American support for Saint-Domingue diminished.

=== French invasion ===
Article 3 of L'Ouverture's 1801 Haitian Constitution stated: "Slaves cannot exist on this territory; servitude is abolished forever. All men are born, live and die free and French." But, as the threat from Napoleon Bonaparte loomed, this provision seems to have been ignored:

Like the early rulers of Haiti who followed him, Toussaint was willing to participate in a one-way version of the slave trade in order to increase his workforce and his army. Bunel was dispatched to Jamaica to purchase ten thousand slaves from the English ... By the terms of Article 3, such arrivals would have to be freed as soon as they reached the colony, but the cloudy language about 'engagements' suggests that some form of indentured servitude was being contemplated.

Bonaparte's brother-in-law, General Charles Leclerc, invaded Saint-Domingue in 1802. Bunel's wife was imprisoned, and he was forced to pay what was essentially a ransom. Leclerc captured and imprisoned L'Ouverture, and deported him to France, where he died in 1803. Bunel was also deported to France.

Bunel returned to Philadelphia, Pennsylvania in 1803, where he became a major exporter of contraband goods to Saint-Domingue. He returned to Haiti during the reign of Dessalines. He, and later his wife, eventually settled permanently in Haiti.

== See also ==
- President's House (Philadelphia, Pennsylvania) — Third Presidential Mansion.
