= Nigger =

Racial slur against black people

Nigger is a racial slur directed at black people. References to nigger have been increasingly replaced by the euphemism "the N-word", notably in cases where nigger is mentioned but not directly used. In an instance of linguistic reappropriation, the term nigger is also used casually and fraternally among African Americans, most commonly in the form of nigga, whose spelling reflects the phonology of African-American English.

The origin of the word lies with the Latin adjective niger ([ˈnɪɡɛr]), meaning 'black'. It was initially seen as a relatively neutral term, essentially synonymous with the English word negro. Early attested uses during the Atlantic slave trade (16th–19th century) often conveyed a merely patronizing attitude. The word took on a derogatory connotation from the mid-18th century onward, and "degenerated into an overt slur" by the middle of the 19th century. Some authors still used the term in a neutral sense up until the later part of the 20th century, at which point the use of nigger became increasingly controversial, regardless of context or intent of the speaker.

Because the word nigger has historically "wreaked symbolic violence, often accompanied by physical violence", it began to disappear from general popular culture from the second half of the 20th century onward, with the exception of cases derived from intra-group usage such as hip-hop culture. The Merriam-Webster Online Dictionary describes the term as "perhaps the most offensive and inflammatory racial slur in English". The Oxford English Dictionary writes that "this word is one of the most controversial in English, and is liable to be considered offensive or taboo in almost all contexts (even when used as a self-description)". At the trial of O. J. Simpson, prosecutor Christopher Darden referred to it as "the filthiest, dirtiest, nastiest word in the English language".

Intra-group usage has been criticized by some contemporary Black American authors, a group of them (the eradicationists) calling for the total abandonment of its usage (even under the variant nigga), which they see as contributing to the "construction of an identity founded on self-hate". In wider society, the inclusion of the word nigger in classic works of literature (as in Mark Twain's 1884 book The Adventures of Huckleberry Finn) and in more recent cultural productions (such as Quentin Tarantino's 1994 film Pulp Fiction and 2012 film Django Unchained) has sparked controversy and ongoing debate.

The word nigger has also been historically used to designate "any person considered to be of low social status" (as in the expression white nigger) or "any person whose behavior is regarded as reprehensible". In some cases, with awareness of the word's offensive connotation, but without intention to cause offense, it can refer to a "victim of prejudice likened to that endured by African Americans" (as in John Lennon's 1972 song "Woman Is the Nigger of the World").

== Etymology and history ==
=== Early use ===
The word nigger, then spelled in English as neger or niger, appeared in the 16th century as an adaptation of French nègre, itself from Spanish negro. They go back to the Latin adjective niger ([ˈnɪɡɛr]), meaning "black".

In its original English-language usage, nigger was a word for a dark-skinned individual. The earliest known published use of the term dates from 1574, in a work alluding to "the Nigers of Aethiop, bearing witnes". According to the Oxford English Dictionary, the first derogatory usage of the term nigger was recorded two centuries later, in 1775.

In 1619 colonial America, John Rolfe used negars in describing the African slaves shipped to the Virginia colony. Later American English spellings, neger and neggar, prevailed in New York under the Dutch, as well as in the metropolitan Philadelphia's Moravian and Pennsylvania Dutch communities; the African Burial Ground in New York City originally was known by the Dutch name Begraafplaats van de Neger (Cemetery of the Negro). An early occurrence of neger in American English dates from 1625 in Rhode Island. Lexicographer Noah Webster suggested the neger spelling in place of negro in his 1806 dictionary.

=== 18th- and 19th-century United States ===
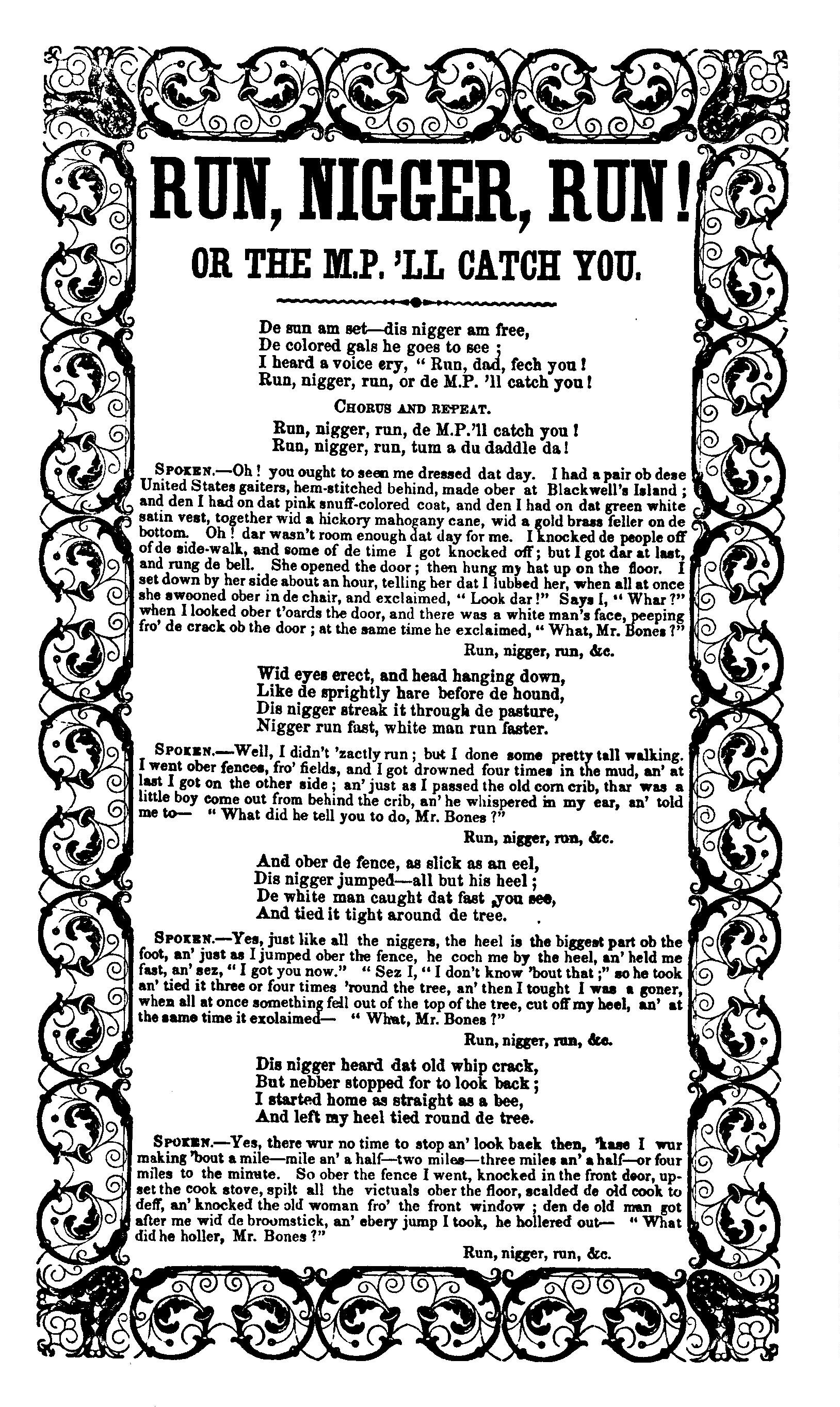
Lyrics for the song "Run, Nigger, Run", about a fugitive slave escaping from a slave patrol, printed in 1851

During the late 18th and early 19th centuries, the word "nigger" also described an actual labor category, which African American laborers adopted for themselves as a social identity, and thus white people used the descriptor word as a distancing or derogatory epithet, as if "quoting Black people" and their non-standard language. During the early 1800s to the late 1840s fur trade in the Western United States, the word was spelled "niggur", and is often recorded in the literature of the time. George Ruxton used it in his "mountain man" lexicon, without pejorative connotation. "Niggur" was evidently similar to the modern use of "dude" or "guy". This passage from Ruxton's Life in the Far West illustrates the word in spoken form—the speaker here referring to himself: "Travler, marm, this niggur's no travler; I ar' a trapper, marm, a mountain-man, wagh!" It was not used as a term exclusively for Blacks among mountain men during this period, as Indians, Mexicans, and Frenchmen and Anglos alike could be a "niggur". "The noun slipped back and forth from derogatory to endearing."

By 1859, the term was clearly used to offend, in an attack on abolitionist John Brown.

The term "colored" or "negro" became a respectful alternative. In 1851, the Boston Vigilance Committee, an abolitionist organization, posted warnings to the Colored People of Boston and vicinity. Writing in 1904, journalist Clifton Johnson documented the "opprobrious" character of the word nigger, emphasizing that it was chosen in the South precisely because it was more offensive than "colored" or "negro". By the turn of the century, "colored" had become sufficiently mainstream that it was chosen as the racial self-identifier for the National Association for the Advancement of Colored People (NAACP). In 2008 Carla Sims, its communications director, said "the term 'colored' is not derogatory, [the NAACP] chose the word 'colored' because it was the most positive description commonly used [in 1909, when the association was founded]. It's outdated and antiquated but not offensive."

Mark Twain, in the autobiographic book Life on the Mississippi (1883), used the term within quotes, indicating reported speech, but used the term "negro" when writing in his own narrative persona. Joseph Conrad published a novella in Britain with the title The Nigger of the "Narcissus" (1897); in the United States, it was released as The Children of the Sea: A Tale of the Forecastle; the original had been called "the ugliest conceivable title" in a British review and American reviewers understood the change as reflecting American "refinement" and "prudery."

The US edition of Joseph Conrad's The Nigger of the "Narcissus" was called The Children of the Sea.

=== 20th-century United States ===
A style guide to British English usage, H.W. Fowler's A Dictionary of Modern English Usage, states in the first edition (1926) that applying the word nigger to "others than full or partial negroes" is "felt as an insult by the person described, & betrays in the speaker, if not deliberate insolence, at least a very arrogant inhumanity"; but the second edition (1965) states "N. has been described as 'the term that carries with it all the obloquy and contempt and rejection which whites have inflicted on blacks'". The quoted formula goes back to the writings of the American journalist Harold R. Isaacs, who used it in several writings between 1963 and 1975. Black characters in Nella Larsen's 1929 novel Passing view its use as offensive; one says "I'm really not such an idiot that I don't realize that if a man calls me a nigger, it's his fault the first time, but mine if he has the opportunity to do it again."

By the late 1960s, the social change brought about by the civil rights movement had legitimized the racial identity word Black as mainstream American English usage to denote Black-skinned Americans of African ancestry. President Thomas Jefferson had used this word of his slaves in his Notes on the State of Virginia (1785), but "Black" had not been widely used until the later 20th century. (See Black pride, and, in the context of worldwide anti-colonialism initiatives, Négritude.)

In the 1980s, the term "African American" was advanced analogously to such terms as "German American","Irish American", and "Italian American" and was adopted by major media outlets. Moreover, as a compound word, African American resembles the vogue word Afro-American, an early-1970s popular usage. Some Black Americans continue to use the word nigger, often spelled as nigga and niggah, without irony, either to neutralize the word's impact or as a sign of solidarity.

== Usage ==
Surveys from 2006 showed that the American public widely perceived usage of the term to be wrong or unacceptable, but that nearly half of whites and two-thirds of Blacks knew someone personally who referred to Blacks by the term. Nearly one-third of whites and two-thirds of Blacks said they had personally used the term within the last five years.

=== In names of people, places and things ===
The word nigger was once widely used in the names of products, colors, plants, places, and as people's nicknames, among others. Such uses have fallen out of favor since the 20th century.

=== Political use ===
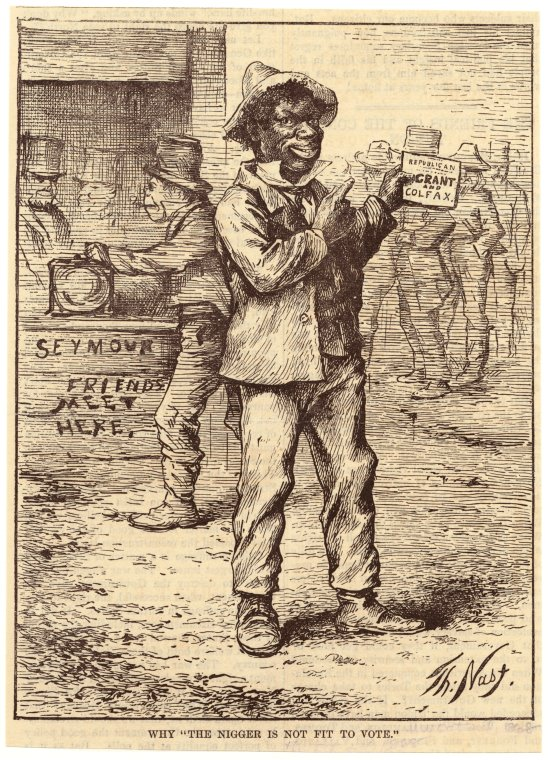
Historical American cartoon titled "Why the nigger is not fit to vote", by Thomas Nast, arguing the reason Democrats objected to African-Americans having the vote was that, in the 1868 US presidential election, African-Americans voted for the Republican candidates Ulysses S. Grant and Schuyler Colfax. "Seymour friends meet here" in the background is a reference to the Democratic Party candidate: Horatio Seymour.

"Niggers in the White House" was written in reaction to an October 1901 White House dinner hosted by Republican President Theodore Roosevelt, who had invited Booker T. Washington—an African-American presidential advisor—as a guest. The poem reappeared in 1929 after First Lady Lou Hoover, wife of President Herbert Hoover, invited Jessie De Priest, the wife of African-American congressman Oscar De Priest, to a tea for congressmen's wives at the White House. The identity of the author—who used the byline "unchained poet"—remains unknown.

In explaining his refusal to be conscripted to fight the Vietnam War (1955–1975), professional boxer Muhammad Ali said, "No Vietcong ever called me nigger." Later, his modified answer was the title of a documentary, No Vietnamese Ever Called Me Nigger (1968), about the front-line lot of the U.S. Army Black soldier in combat in Vietnam. An Ali biographer reports that, when interviewed by Robert Lipsyte in 1966, the boxer actually said, "I ain't got no quarrel with them Viet Cong."

On February 28, 2007, the New York City Council symbolically banned the use of the word nigger; however, there is no penalty for using it. This formal resolution also requests excluding from Grammy Award consideration every song whose lyrics contain the word; however, Ron Roecker, vice president of communication for the Recording Academy, doubted it will have any effect on actual nominations.

The word can be invoked politically for effect. When Detroit mayor Kwame Kilpatrick came under intense scrutiny for his conduct in 2008, he deviated from an address to the city council, saying, "In the past 30 days, I've been called a nigger more than any time in my entire life." Opponents accused him of "playing the race card" to save his political life.

=== Cultural use ===
The implicit racism of the word nigger has generally rendered its use taboo. Magazines and newspapers typically do not use this word but instead print censored versions such as "n*gg*r", "n**ger", "n——" or "the N-word"; see below.

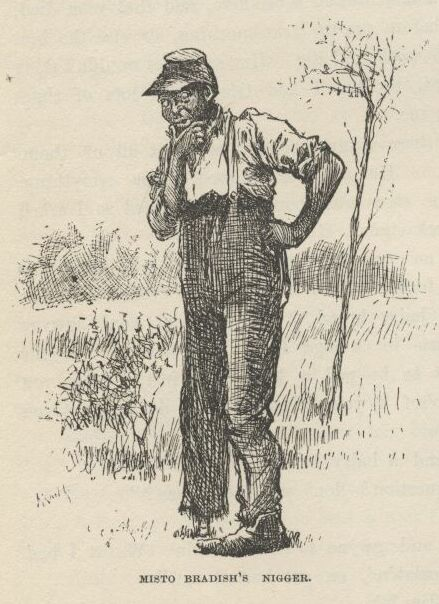
1885 illustration from Mark Twain's Adventures of Huckleberry Finn, captioned "Misto Bradish's nigger"

The use of nigger in older literature has become controversial because of the word's modern meaning as a racist insult. One of the most enduring controversies has been the word's use in Mark Twain's novel Adventures of Huckleberry Finn (1885). Huckleberry Finn was the fifth most challenged book during the 1990s, according to the American Library Association. The novel is written from the point of view of, and largely in the language of, an uneducated white boy, who is drifting down the Mississippi River on a raft with an adult escaped slave named Jim. The word "nigger" is used (mostly about Jim) over 200 times. Twain's advocates note that the novel is composed in then-contemporary vernacular usage, not racist stereotype, because Jim, the Black man, is a sympathetic character.

In 2011, a new edition published by NewSouth Books replaced the word nigger with slave and also removed the word injun. The change was spearheaded by Twain scholar Alan Gribben in the hope of "countering the 'pre-emptive censorship'" that results from the book's being removed from school curricula over language concerns. The changes sparked outrage from critics Elon James, Alexandra Petri and Chris Meadows.

In his 1999 memoir All Souls, Irish-American Michael Patrick MacDonald describes how many white residents of the Old Colony Housing Project in South Boston used this meaning to degrade the people considered to be of lower status, whether white or Black.

Of course, no one considered himself a nigger. It was always something you called someone who could be considered anything less than you. I soon found out there were a few [B]lack families living in Old Colony. They'd lived there for years and everyone said that they were okay, that they weren't niggers but just [B]lack. It felt good to all of us to not be as bad as the hopeless people in D Street or, God forbid, the ones in Columbia Point, who were both [B]lack and niggers. But now I was jealous of the kids in Old Harbor Project down the road, which seemed like a step up from Old Colony ...

=== In an academic setting ===
The word's usage in literature has led to it being a point of discussion in university lectures as well. In 2008, Arizona State University English professor Neal A. Lester created what has been called "the first ever college-level class designed to explore the word 'nigger'". Starting in the following decade, colleges struggled with attempts to teach material about the slur in a sensitive manner. In 2012, a sixth grade Chicago teacher Lincoln Brown was suspended after repeating the contents of a racially charged note being passed around in class. Brown later filed a federal civil rights lawsuit against the headmaster and the Chicago public schools. A New Orleans high school also experienced controversy in 2017. Such increased attention prompted Elizabeth Stordeur Pryor, the daughter of Richard Pryor and a professor at Smith College, to give a talk opining that the word was leading to a "social crisis" in higher education.

In addition to Smith College, Emory University, Augsburg University, Southern Connecticut State University, and Simpson College all suspended professors in 2019 over referring to the word "nigger" by name in classroom settings. In two other cases, a professor at Princeton decided to stop teaching a course on hate speech after students protested his utterance of "nigger" and a professor at DePaul had his law course cancelled after 80% of the enrolled students transferred out. Instead of pursuing disciplinary action, a student at the College of the Desert challenged his professor in a viral class presentation which argued that her use of the word in a lecture was not justified.

=== In the workplace ===
In 2018, the head of the media company Netflix, Reed Hastings, fired his chief communications officer, Jonathan Friedland, for using the word twice during internal discussions about sensitive words. In explaining why, Hastings wrote:

[The word's use] in popular media like music and film have created some confusion as to whether or not there is ever a time when the use of the N-word is acceptable. For non-Black people, the word should not be spoken as there is almost no context in which it is appropriate or constructive (even when singing a song or reading a script). There is not a way to neutralize the emotion and history behind the word in any context. The use of the phrase 'N-word' was created as a euphemism, and the norm, with the intention of providing an acceptable replacement and moving people away from using the specific word. When a person violates this norm, it creates resentment, intense frustration, and great offense for many.

The following year, screenwriter Walter Mosley turned down a job after his human resources department took issue with him using the word to describe racism that he experienced as a Black man.

While defending Laurie Sheck, a professor who was cleared of ethical violations for quoting I Am Not Your Negro by James Baldwin, John McWhorter wrote that efforts to condemn racist language by white Americans had undergone mission creep. Similar controversies outside the United States have occurred at the University of Western Ontario in Canada and the Madrid campus of Syracuse University. In June 2020, Canadian news host Wendy Mesley was suspended and replaced with a guest host after she attended a meeting on racial justice and, in the process of quoting a journalist, used "a word that no-one like me should ever use". In August 2020, BBC News, with the agreement of victim and family, mentioned the slur when reporting on a physical and verbal assault on the Black National Health Service worker and musician K-Dogg. Within the week the BBC received over 18,600 complaints, the Black radio host David Whitely resigned in protest, and the BBC apologized.

In 2021, in Tampa, Florida, a 27-year-old Black employee at a Dunkin' Donuts punched a 77-year-old white customer after the customer had repeatedly called the employee a nigger. The customer fell to the floor and hit his head. Three days later, he died, having suffered a skull fracture and brain contusions. The employee was arrested and charged with manslaughter. In a plea bargain, the employee pled guilty to felony battery, and was sentenced to two years of house arrest. In 2022, in explaining why the employee did not receive any jail time, Grayson Kamm, a spokesman for Hillsborough State Attorney Andrew Warren, said "Two of the primary factors were the aggressive approach the victim took toward the defendant and everyone working with the defendant, and that the victim repeatedly used possibly the most aggressive and offensive term in the English language."

=== Intra-group versus intergroup usage ===
Black listeners often react to the term nigger differently, depending on whether it is used by white speakers or by Black speakers. In the former case, it is regularly understood as insensitive or insulting; in the latter, it may carry notes of in-group disparagement, or it may be understood as neutral or affectionate, a possible instance of reappropriation.

In the Black community, nigger is often rendered as nigga. This usage has been popularized by the rap and hip-hop music cultures and is used as part of an in-group lexicon and speech. It is not necessarily derogatory and is often used to mean homie or friend.

Acceptance of intra-group usage of the word nigga is still debated, although it has established a foothold amongst younger generations. The NAACP denounces the use of both nigga and nigger. As of 2001, trends indicated that usage of the term in intragroup settings is increasing even amongst white youth, due to the popularity of rap and hip-hop culture. Linguist Keith Allan rejects the view that nigger is always a slur, arguing that it is also used as a marker of camaraderie and friendship, comparable to the British and Australian term "mate" or the American "buddy".

According to Arthur K. Spears in Diverse Issues in Higher Education, 2006:

In many African-American neighborhoods, nigga is simply the most common term used to refer to any male, of any race or ethnicity. Increasingly, the term has been applied to any person, male or female. "Where y'all niggas goin?" is said with no self-consciousness or animosity to a group of women, for the routine purpose of obtaining information. The point: nigga is evaluatively neutral in terms of its inherent meaning; it may express positive, neutral, or negative attitudes;

Kevin Cato, meanwhile, observes:

For instance, a show on Black Entertainment Television, a cable network aimed at a Black audience, described the word nigger as a "term of endearment". "In the African American community, the word nigga (not nigger) brings out feelings of pride." (Davis 1.) Here the word evokes a sense of community and oneness among Black people. Many teens I interviewed felt the word had no power when used amongst friends, but when used among white people the word took on a completely different meaning. In fact, comedian Alex Thomas on BET stated, "I still better not hear no white boy say that to me ... I hear a white boy say that to me, it means 'White boy, you gonna get your ass beat.'"

Addressing the use of nigger by black people, philosopher and public intellectual Cornel West said in 2007:

There's a certain rhythmic seduction to the word. If you speak in a sentence, and you have to say cat, companion, or friend, as opposed to nigger, then the rhythmic presentation is off. That rhythmic language is a form of historical memory for Black people ... When Richard Pryor came back from Africa, and decided to stop using the word onstage, he would sometimes start to slip up, because he was so used to speaking that way. It was the right word at the moment to keep the rhythm together in his sentence making.

==== 2010s: Increase in use and controversy ====
In the 2010s, nigger in its various forms saw use with increasing frequency by African Americans amongst themselves or in self-expression, the most common swear word in hip-hop music lyrics. Ta-Nehisi Coates suggested that it continues to be unacceptable for non-Blacks to utter while singing or rapping along to hip-hop, and that by being so restrained it gives white Americans (specifically) an impression of what it is like to not be entitled to "do anything they please, anywhere". A concern often raised is whether frequent exposure will inevitably lead to a dilution of the extremely negative perception of the word among the majority of non-Black Americans who currently consider its use unacceptable and shocking.

== Related words ==
=== Derivatives ===
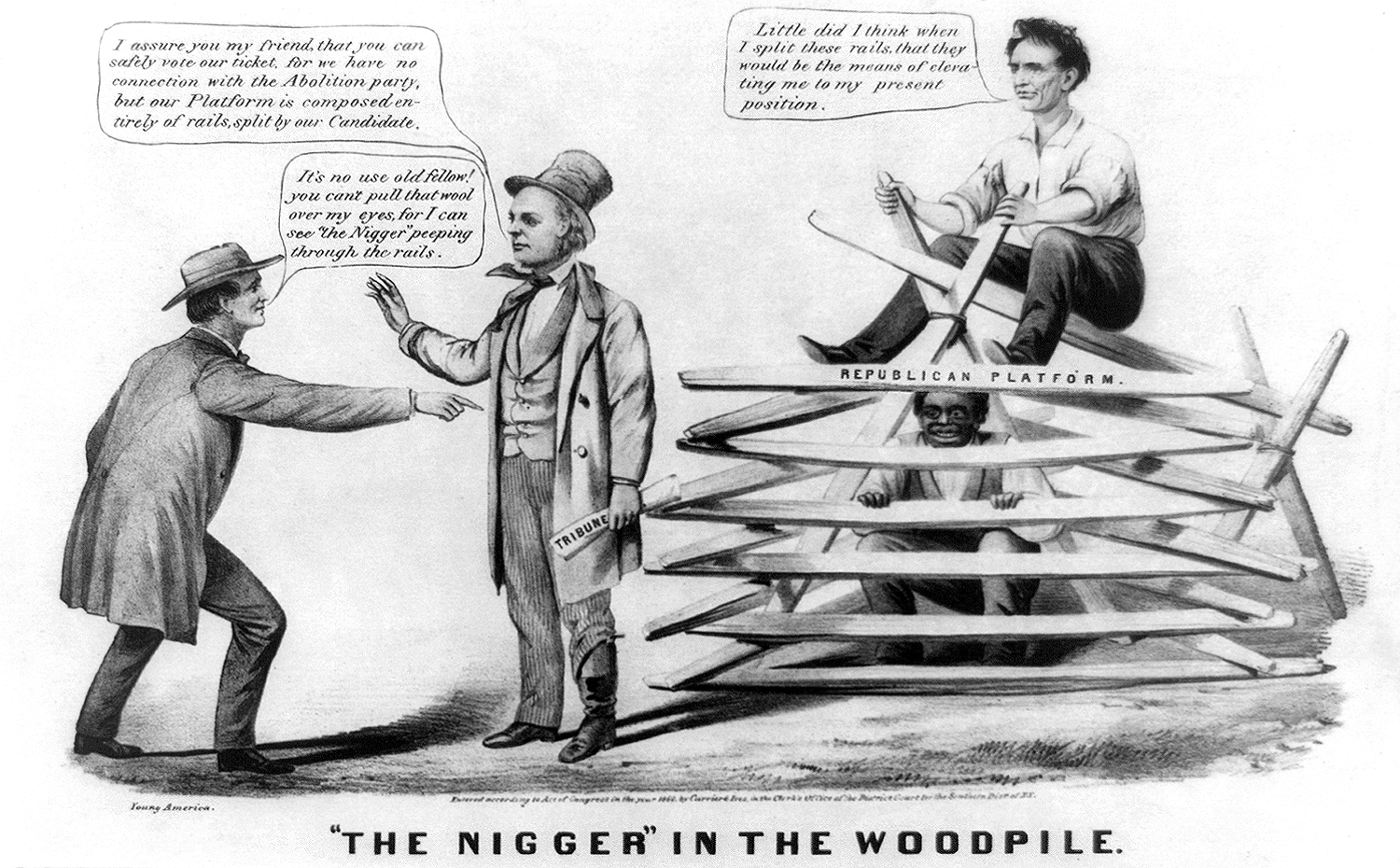
Anti-abolitionist cartoon from the 1860 presidential campaign illustrating colloquial usage of "Nigger in the woodpile"

In several English-speaking countries, "Niggerhead" or "nigger head" was used as a descriptive name for many sorts of things, including commercial products, places, plants and animals. It also is or was a colloquial technical term in industry, mining, and seafaring. Nigger as "hidden defect" derives from "nigger in the woodpile", a US slave-era phrase denoting escaped slaves hiding in train-transported woodpiles. In the 1840s, the Morning Chronicle newspaper report series London Labour and the London Poor, by Henry Mayhew, records the usages of both "nigger" and the similar-sounding word "niggard" denoting a false bottom for a grate.

In American English, "nigger lover" initially applied to abolitionists, then to white people sympathetic towards Black Americans. The portmanteau word wigger ('White' + 'nigger') denotes a white person emulating "street Black behavior", hoping to gain acceptance to the hip-hop, thug, and gangsta sub-cultures. Norman Mailer wrote of the antecedents of this phenomenon in 1957 in his essay The White Negro.

In Ukraine, the word "zigger" (Ukrainian: 'зіггер') is sometimes used as a derogatory term by Ukrainians to refer to Russian soldiers and those who follow the Russian government's propaganda. The word comes from replacing the first letter of "nigger" with a Z, which is a reference to the "Z" tactical symbol used by Russian troops and Russian nationalists. It is used as a more offensive alternative to calling someone a "vatnik."

=== The N-word euphemism ===
Notable usage

The prosecutor [Christopher Darden], his voice trembling, added that the "N-word" was so vile he would not utter it. "It's the filthiest, dirtiest, nastiest word in the English language."

— Kenneth B. Noble, January 14, 1995 The New York Times

One of the first uses of the N-word euphemism by a major public figure came during the racially contentious O. J. Simpson murder case in 1995. Key prosecution witness Detective Mark Fuhrman, of the Los Angeles Police Department—who denied using racist language on duty—impeached himself with his prolific use of nigger in tape recordings about his police work. Co-prosecutor Christopher Darden refused to say the actual word, calling it "the filthiest, dirtiest, nastiest word in the English language". Media personnel who reported on Fuhrman's testimony substituted the N-word for nigger.

=== Similar-sounding words ===
Niger (Latin for "black") occurs in Latinate scientific nomenclature and is the root word for some homophones of nigger; sellers of niger seed (used as bird feed), sometimes use the spelling Nyjer seed. The classical Latin pronunciation /ˈniɡeɾ/ sounds similar to the English /ˈnɪɡər/, occurring in biologic and anatomic names, such as Hyoscyamus niger (black henbane), and even for animals that are in fact not black, such as Sciurus niger (fox squirrel).

Nigra is the Latin feminine form of niger (black), used in biologic and anatomic names such as substantia nigra (black substance).

The word niggardly (miserly) is etymologically unrelated to nigger, derived from the Old Norse word nig (stingy) and the Middle English word nigon. In the US, this word has been misinterpreted as related to nigger and taken as offensive. In January 1999, David Howard, a white Washington, D.C., city employee, was compelled to resign after using niggardly—in a financial context—while speaking with Black colleagues, who took umbrage. After reviewing the misunderstanding, Mayor Anthony A. Williams offered to reinstate Howard to his former position. Howard refused reinstatement but took a job elsewhere in the mayor's government.

Negro [ˈne.ɣ̞ɾo] is the Spanish word for 'black', and is commonly a part of place names and proper names, particularly in the Southwest of the United States.

Shub-Niggurath, a fictional deity in the Cthulhu Mythos created by H. P. Lovecraft, was cited by Chaosium as sounding similar to nigger and offending some players. While Lovecraft did hold racist views, scholars of his work agree that "Shub-Niggurath" was not derived from the word. To address players' concerns and avoid the Scunthorpe problem, Chaosium opted to rename the deity "Shub-Gorath" in games it produced starting in 2026.

=== Denotational extension ===
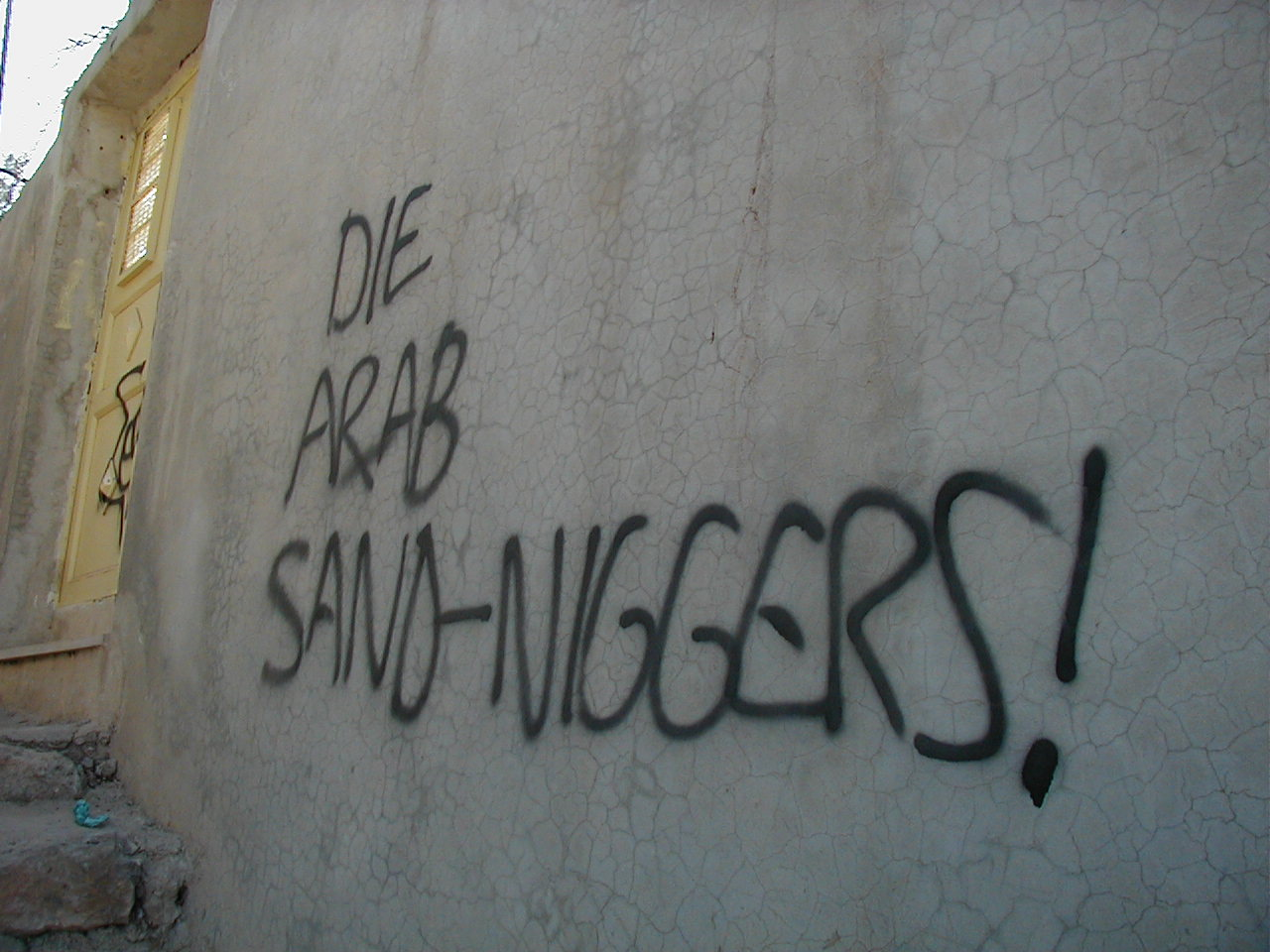
"Die Arab sand-niggers", graffiti by far-right Israeli Kach activists on a Palestinian home in Hebron in 2002

The denotations of nigger also include non-Black/non-white and other disadvantaged people. Some of these terms are self-chosen, to identify with the oppression and resistance of Black Americans; others are ethnic slurs used by outsiders.

Jerry Farber's 1967 essay collection, The Student as Nigger, used the word as a metaphor for what he saw as the role forced on students. Farber had been, at the time, frequently arrested as a civil rights activist while beginning his career as a literature professor.

In his 1968 autobiography White Niggers of America: The Precocious Autobiography of a Quebec "Terrorist", Pierre Vallières, a Front de libération du Québec leader, refers to the oppression of the Québécois people in North America.

In 1969, in the course of being interviewed by the British magazine Nova, artist Yoko Ono said "woman is the nigger of the world"; three years later, her husband, John Lennon, published the song of the same name—about the worldwide phenomenon of discrimination against women—which was socially and politically controversial to US sensibilities.

Sand nigger, an ethnic slur against Arabs, and timber nigger and prairie nigger, ethnic slurs against Native Americans, are examples of the racist extension of nigger upon other non-white peoples.

In 1978, singer Patti Smith used the word in "Rock N Roll Nigger". One year later in 1979, English singer Elvis Costello used the phrase "white nigger" in his song "Oliver's Army". The slur usually remains uncensored on radio stations, but Costello's usage of the word came under scrutiny, particularly after he used racial slurs during a drunken argument with Stephen Stills and Bonnie Bramlett in 1979. In the same year, Costello's father published a letter in Rolling Stone defending his son against accusations of racism, stating "Nothing could be further from the truth. My own background has meant that I am passionately opposed to any form of prejudice based on religion or race ... His mother comes from the tough multiracial area of Liverpool, and I think she would still beat the tar out of him if his orthodoxy were in doubt".

Historian Eugene Genovese, noted for bringing a Marxist perspective to the study of power, class and relations between planters and slaves in the South, uses the word pointedly in The World the Slaveholders Made (1988).

For reasons common to the slave condition all slave classes displayed a lack of industrial initiative and produced the famous Lazy Nigger, who under Russian serfdom and elsewhere was white. Just as not all Blacks, even under the most degrading forms of slavery, consented to become niggers, so by no means all or even most of the niggers in history have been Black.

The editor of Green Egg, a magazine described in The Encyclopedia of American Religions as a significant periodical, published an essay entitled "Niggers of the New Age". This argued that Neo-Pagans were treated badly by other parts of the New Age movement.

=== Other languages ===
Other languages, particularly Romance languages, have words that sound similar to or share etymological roots with nigger but do not necessarily mean the same. In some of these languages, the words refer to the color black in general and are not specifically used to refer to Black people. When used to refer to Black people, these words have acquired varying degrees of offensiveness, ranging from completely neutral (as in Spanish negro) to highly racist (as in Finnish Neekeri). Examples of related words in other languages include:

- Bulgarian: Негър (negar), loaned from French nègre, is considered a neutral word for Black people in Bulgaria. Some publications and institutions use чернокож or тъмнокож, but the use of негър is more widespread.
- Dutch: Neger ('negro') used to be neutral, but many now consider it to be avoided in favor of zwarte ('Black'). Zwartje ('little Black one') can be amicably or offensively used. Nikker is always pejorative.
- Finnish: Neekeri ('negro/nigger'), as a loan word ('Neger') from the Swedish language, appeared for the first time in a book published in 1771. The use of the Finnish equivalent (neekeri) began in the late 19th century. Until the 1980s, it was commonly used and generally not yet considered derogatory, although a few instances of it being considered to be so have been documented since the 1950s; by the mid-1990s the word was considered racist, especially in the metropolitan area and among the younger population. It has since then usually been replaced by the metonym musta ('Black [person]'). In a survey conducted in 2000, Finnish respondents considered the term Neekeri to be among the most offensive of minority designations.
- French: Nègre is now considered derogatory. Although Nègre littéraire was the standard term for a ghostwriter, it has largely been supplanted by prête-plume. Some white Frenchmen have the surname Nègre. The word can still be used as a synonym of "sweetheart" in some traditional Louisiana French creole songs.
- German: Neger is dated and now considered offensive. Schwarze/-r ('Black [person]') or Farbige/-r ("colored [person]") is more neutral.
- Haitian Creole: nèg is used for any man in general, regardless of skin color (like dude in American English). Haitian Creole derives predominantly from French.
- Italian has three variants: negro, nero and di colore. The first one is the most historically attested and was the most commonly used until the 1960s as an equivalent of the English word "negro". It was gradually felt as offensive during the 1970s and replaced with nero and di colore. Nero was considered a better translation of the English word Black, while di colore is a loan translation of the English word colored.
- Portuguese: Negro (as well as preto) is neutral; nevertheless preto can be offensive or at least "politically incorrect" and is almost never proudly used by Afro-Brazilians. Crioulo and macaco are always extremely pejorative.
- Romanian: Negrotei is derogatory;
- Russian: the word негр (negr) has been commonly used as neutral word to describe Black people until recent years. It can also be used as a synonym for underpaid worker; "литературный негр" (literaturny negr) means ghostwriter. Nowadays, a Black person would often be described neutrally as "чернокожий" (chernokozhiy, 'Black-skinned'), though the organization Help Needed instead recommends "темнокожий" (temnokozhiy, 'dark-skinned').
- Spanish: Negro is the word for "black" and is the only way to refer to that color.

== See also ==
- Controversies about the word niggardly
- List of ethnic slurs
  - List of ethnic group names used as insults
  - Kaffir (ethnic slur)
  - Blackfella
- Guilty or Innocent of Using the N Word, a 2006 documentary
- List of topics related to the African diaspora
- "With Apologies to Jesse Jackson", an episode of South Park with a plot revolving around the word's extreme offensiveness
- Golliwog
- Profanity

== Sources ==
- "nigger". The Oxford English Dictionary (2nd ed.). 1989.
- Fuller, Neely Jr. (1984). The United Independent Compensatory Code/System/Concept: A Textbook/Workbook for Thought, Speech, and/or Action, for Victims of Racism (white supremacy). ASIN B000BVZW38.
- Kennedy, Randall (2002). Nigger: The Strange Career of a Troublesome Word. New York: Pantheon Books. ISBN 978-0-375-42172-3.
- Smith, Stephanie (2005). Household Words: Bloomers, Sucker, Bombshell, Scab, Nigger, Cyber. Minneapolis: University of Minnesota Press. ISBN 978-0-8166-4552-7.
- Swan, Robert J. (2003). New Amsterdam Gehenna: Segregated Death in New York City, 1630–1801. Brooklyn: Noir Verite Press. ISBN 978-0-9722813-0-0.
- Worth, Robert F. (Fall 1995). "Nigger Heaven and the Harlem Renaissance". African American Review. 29 (3): 461–473. doi:10.2307/3042395. JSTOR 3042395.
