= Pandora's Box (nightclub) =

1960s nightclub in Los Angeles, California

- Pandora's Box on the Sunset Strip
- Interactive map of Pandora's Box
- Address: 8118 Sunset Blvd
- Location: Los Angeles, California
- Coordinates: 34.0978°N 118.3664°W
- Owner: Jimmy O'Neill
- Type: Nightclub, coffeehouse

Construction
- Closed: 1966

Pandora's Box was a nightclub and coffeehouse on the Sunset Strip in Los Angeles, California. It was at the center of the Sunset Strip curfew riots in 1966.

== History ==
In the late 1950s Pandora's Box was a popular coffeehouse located at 8118 Sunset Boulevard, on the corner of Sunset Boulevard and Crescent Heights Boulevard. Home to some of the more adventurous artists in town, Pandora's Box hosted up-and-coming jazz musicians such as Les McCann and Carla Bley, while artist Burt Shonberg adorned the interior of the club with a mural similar to his works in the famous Cafe Frankenstein and The Purple Onion.

In 1962, the club was bought by disc jockey and Shindig! host Jimmy O'Neill. O'Neill's trendsetting booking policy made Pandora's Box the center of the Sunset Strip youth scene. The club featured performances by artists such as the Beach Boys, the Byrds and Sonny & Cher.

While the club itself did not serve alcohol, Pandora's Box very soon became a hangout where underage drinking was not uncommon among people. Moreover, numerous complaints arose about drug use and loud music. Ultimately however, the biggest problem that arose for the club was the obstructions it caused upon traffic, a result of both its numerous visitors and its unfortunate location at one of the busiest intersections in the city.

In 1966, annoyed residents and business owners in the district had encouraged the passage of a strict 10:00 pm curfew and loitering law to reduce the traffic congestion and disturbances resulting from crowds of young club patrons. This was perceived by the young, local rock music fans as an infringement on their civil rights, and for weeks tensions and protests swelled. On Saturday, November 12, 1966, fliers were distributed along the Strip inviting people to demonstrate later that day. Hours before the protest one of L.A.'s rock 'n' roll radio stations announced there would be a rally at Pandora's Box. That evening, as many as a 1,000 youthful demonstrators, including such celebrities as Jack Nicholson and Peter Fonda (who was handcuffed by police), erupted in protest against the perceived repressive enforcement of these recently invoked curfew laws and the forced closure of Pandora's Box.

The unrest continued the next night and off and on throughout November and December, while Pandora's Box had already been forced to close its doors. Sonny & Cher, who got their start on the Strip as Caesar and Cleo, made an appearance in front of Pandora's Box in December, while on Christmas Day, Pandora's Box reopened for one night only. There, according to author Domenic Priore, Stephen Stills first publicly performed "For What It's Worth, a song written in response to the riot."

Meanwhile, the local administration had decided to get tough, and rescinded the "youth permits" of twelve of the Strip's clubs, thereby making them off-limits to anybody under 21. In November 1966, the Los Angeles City Council voted to acquire and demolish Pandora's Box. The club was eventually demolished in early August 1967.

== Legacy ==
Buffalo Springfield's 1967 hit single "For What It's Worth (Stop, Hey, What's That Sound)" was written by group member Stephen Stills in response to the riots around Pandora's Box. Later, Stills said: "Riot is a ridiculous name, it was a funeral for Pandora's Box. But it looked like a revolution."

"Plastic People", a song recorded by Frank Zappa and The Mothers of Invention in November 1966, directly mentions Pandora's Box in its lyrics: "I hear the sound of marching feet... Down Sunset Boulevard to Crescent Heights... and there... at Pandora's box... We are confronted with... a vast Quantity of... Plastic people...".

The 1967 film Riot on Sunset Strip is a fictionalized depiction of the events around Pandora's Box and was filmed and released within four months of the protest.

The nightclub is anachronistically featured in Quentin Tarantino's 2019 film Once Upon a Time in Hollywood (the film is set in 1969).

== See also ==
- London Fog
- Roxy Theatre
- Sunset Boulevard
- Sunset Strip
- West Hollywood, California
- Whisky a Go Go
