= Jimmy O'Neill (DJ) =

American broadcaster

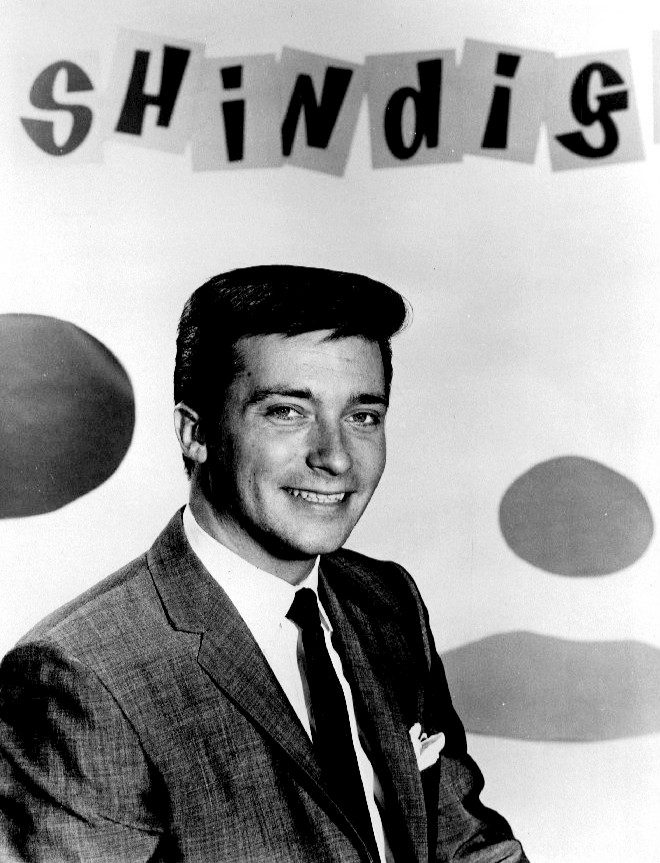
- O'Neill as the host of Shindig!, 1964
- Born: James Franklin O'Neill; January 8, 1940; Enid, Oklahoma, US
- Died: January 11, 2013 (aged 73); West Hollywood, California, US
- Occupations: Deejay; radio personality; TV host; producer
- Years active: 1957–1999
- Spouse: Sharon Sheeley (m. 1961; div. 1966)

James Franklin O'Neill (January 8, 1940 – January 11, 2013) was an American DJ and broadcaster who hosted the ABC television musical variety show Shindig! from 1964 to 1966. O'Neill was owner of Pandora's Box, an influential Sunset Strip music venue in West Hollywood, California, that was the center of the 1966 Sunset Strip curfew riots.

== Life and career ==
O'Neill was born in Enid, Oklahoma. After taking a broadcasting class at Enid High School, he began his career in radio at KGWA in Enid in 1957 and then moved to WKY in Oklahoma City in 1958. One year later O'Neill landed a job at KQV in Pittsburgh, Pennsylvania at age 19. He also worked at WCAE. He was hired at KRLA in Los Angeles, California a year after working at KQV.

O'Neill was the first voice heard on KRLA-AM when it switched from a country-western format to top 40. He worked at KRLA-AM from 1959 to 1962, then moved to KFWB from 1963 to 1967. He spent two years at KDAY from 1969 to 1971. He also hosted The Jimmy O'Neill Show on KCOP-TV.

After O'Neill moved to Los Angeles, Chuck Barris, then-ABC daytime programming executive, green-lit the pilot for Shindig!; the show ran from 1964 to 1966. He and his show were depicted on The Flintstones television animated sitcom in the season six episode "Shinrock A Go-Go", which originally aired on December 3, 1965. This episode featured O'Neill, as "Jimmy O'Neillstone", hosting the Bedrock analogue of Shindig, called "Shinrock"; that program featured as one of the guest performers The Beau Brummels (as "The Beau Brummelstones") performing their recent hit, "Laugh, Laugh".

In the 1970s, he worked at KOB in Albuquerque, then it was on to Omaha, Nebraska, radio stations WOW and KOIL. He returned to Los Angeles for two more stints at KRLA from 1984 to 1985 and from 1990 to 1993.

He retired in the mid 1990s and lived in West Hollywood, California; he died at his home there on January 11, 2013, aged 73.

== Personal life ==
O'Neill was married three times, including to songwriter Sharon Sheeley, to socialite Eve I. Johnson, and to Renee Whitman.

He had one son (James) and one daughter (Katy), as well as one stepson (Robin) and one stepdaughter (Megan).
