= Ecology flag =

Ecology Flag may refer to:

- Ecology Flag (American), created in the late 1960s
- Ecology Flag (Australian), created in the late 1990s
