= Los Angeles Free Press =

Defunct American underground newspaper

- Cover of the December 15–22, 1967, edition of the Los Angeles Free Press.
- Type: Weekly
- Format: Underground newspaper
- Owner(s): Art Kunkin (1964–1971); Larry Flynt Publications (1977–1978)
- Founder: Art Kunkin
- Publisher: Art Kunkin (1964–1971); New Way Enterprises, Ltd. (1971–1976); H.A.J., Inc. (1976–1977); Jay Levin (1978)
- Editor-in-chief: Art Kunkin (1964–1973); Jerry Goldberg (1973–1974); Chris Van Ness (1974); Penelope Grenoble (1974–1975); Michael Parrish (1975–1976); Roger J. Gentry (1976–1977); Jay Levin (1978)
- Founded: May 23, 1964; 62 years ago
- Ceased publication: April 3, 1978; 48 years ago
- Relaunched: 2005, 2020
- Headquarters: Los Angeles, California
- Circulation: 95,000 (1970)
- ISSN: 0024-6573
- Free online archives: voices.revealdigital.org

The Los Angeles Free Press, also called the "Freep", is often cited as the first, and certainly was the largest, of the underground newspapers of the 1960s. The Freep was founded in 1964 by Art Kunkin, who served as its publisher until 1971 and continued on as its editor-in-chief through June 1973. The paper closed in 1978. It was unsuccessfully revived a number of times afterward.

== Overview ==
From its inception, the L.A. Free Press saw itself as an advocate of personal freedom. The paper was notable for its radical politics when, in the mid-1960s, such views rarely saw print. The Freep wrote about and was often directly involved in the major historic issues of the 1960s and 1970s, and with the people who shaped them, including the Chicago Seven, Timothy Leary, Allen Ginsberg, and Abbie Hoffman. Both the famous and the infamous would open up to the Los Angeles Free Press, from Bob Dylan to the Black Panthers to Jim Morrison to Iceberg Slim.

The paper regularly reported on and against police brutality, covering topics such as the death of journalist Ruben Salazar, and even publishing the names of undercover drug enforcement operatives.

As Greg Williams of the Gerth Archives said, "It was the first publication to start presenting points of view that the L.A. Times wouldn't touch with a ten-foot pole. They not only had their own political slant, but they also supported the Black community, the Chicano community, and the LGBTQ community in a variety of ways."

Because of its coverage of the Vietnam War and how it became a touchstone for the anti-war movement, the Los Angeles Free Press is given degrees of credit for the ending of the War. The paper grew with the movement, and at its peak was selling over 100,000 copies, with national distribution.

As the paper gained influence, it suffered pushback from the authorities and intimidation by those determined to defend the status quo. Free Press reporters were arrested for covering demonstrations. The paper's offices were bombed three times, with the police neglecting to investigate the crimes. At another point the FBI "convinced" the paper's printer to refuse their business. And, after the Free Press published the names and addresses of narcotic agents, publisher Kunkin and Free Press writer Jerry Applebaum were taken to court by the Attorney General of California, fined $10,000 and "convicted of receiving stolen property — that is, information." (The conviction was later overturned on appeal.)

One of the Los Angeles Free Press's greatest strengths was its music coverage. Among the writers whose bylines appeared were music editor John Carpenter, Tim Devine, Jerry Hopkins, Harvey Kubernik, John Mendelsohn, Anne Moore, Tom Nolan, Steven Rosen, Greg Shaw, John Sinclair, Chris Van Ness, Bill Wasserzieher, and the trio of Pete Johnson, Richard Cromelin, and Don Snowden — all three of whom also wrote for the Los Angeles Times.

The paper also pioneered the emerging field of underground comics. Before becoming an underground comix star, Gilbert Shelton worked for the Freep; his The Fabulous Furry Freak Brothers strip started appearing as a regular feature in 1970. Ron Cobb's underground political cartoons were a regular feature; in November 1969, he created an ecology symbol — a combination of the letters "E" and "O" taken from the words "Environment" and "Organism", respectively — and published it in the Freep, and then placed it in the public domain. Look magazine incorporated the symbol into a flag in their April 21, 1970, issue — it became known as the Ecology Flag. Bobby London's Dirty Duck comic strip ran in the Freep early in the spring of 1971, running underneath Shelton's Fat Freddy's Cat strip.

=== Notable contributors ===
From 1967 to 1970, Gene Youngblood was an associate editor and columnist for the Free Press, where he wrote the "Intermedia" column. Jerry Hopkins wrote the popular "Making It" column for the paper in the late 1960s.

Harlan Ellison's column on television, "The Glass Teat," ran from 1968 to 1970, examining television's impact on the politics and culture of the time, including its presentations of sex, politics, race, the Vietnam War, and violence. These pieces were later collected in two books, The Glass Teat (Ace Books, 1970) and The Other Glass Teat (Ace Books, 1971). Ellison contributed other columns to the paper after 1970.

Author Charles Bukowski's Open City column "Notes of a Dirty Old Man" was taken on by the Los Angeles Free Press beginning in 1969, when the competing L.A. underground paper Open City folded. Bukowski's column continued on until at least 1973.

William S. Burroughs, who briefly dabbled with Scientology, and wrote extensively about it during the late 1960s, eventually abandoned it and publicly eschewed it in an editorial for the Free Press in 1970.

Other notable contributors:

- Jacoba Atlas
- John Bryan
- Joseph Byrd
- Anita Cornwell
- Anne Draper
- Bruce Eisner
- Jim Evans
- Clay Geerdes
- Allen Ginsberg
- Wendy Girard
- Jamake Highwater
- Earl Ofari Hutchinson
- Heber Jentzsch
- Paul Krassner
- Timothy Leary
- Lawrence Lipton
- Ralph Nader
- Jay Robert Nash
- Michael Ochs
- Trina Robbins
- Jerry Rubin
- Ed Sanders
- Paul Schrader
- Peter Dale Scott
- Chuck Stone
- I. F. Stone
- Mark Vallen
- Nicholas von Hoffman
- Jack Weinberg
- Jack S. Margolis

== Publication history ==
=== Origins ===
Native New Yorker Art Kunkin, at the time of the founding of the Los Angeles Free Press, was a 36-year-old unemployed tool and die maker. He was a former organizer for the Socialist Workers Party (SWP), where he had served as business manager of the SWP paper, The Militant. As he told in the Los Angeles Times in 1966, "I wanted to do a weekly in Los Angeles that would be like the Village Voice in New York."

By the spring of 1964, Kunkin had a political commentary radio show on Los Angeles' non-commercial, listener-sponsored radio station KPFK (the second of five stations in the Pacifica Foundation network). The Free Press initially appeared as a one-shot eight-page tabloid, dated May 23, 1964, sold at the annual Los Angeles Renaissance Pleasure Faire and May Market, a fund-raising event for KPFK.

This first issue was entitled The Faire Free Press, with the "Los Angeles Free Press" logo appearing on an inside page. While the outside pages were a spoof of the Faire's Renaissance theme, featuring cute stories like one about a "ban the crossbow" demonstration, the inside contained legitimate underground community news and reviews. Five thousand copies were printed, of which 1,200 sold at a price of 25 cents.

After the Faire ended, Kunkin circulated a brochure to potential investors and found enough backing to start putting out the paper on a regular weekly basis in July 1964.

Early issues of the Los Angeles Free Press was produced mostly by unpaid volunteers. In the beginning, many of them were the same people who volunteered at KPFK.

For its first two years, the paper operated out of free office space in the basement of a Sunset Boulevard coffee house called The Fifth Estate, which was an informal headquarters for the hippies who gathered and later rioted on the Sunset Strip in 1966. The paper grew slowly at first; in October 1966 Kunkin informed a reporter for the L.A. Times that the Free Press had 9,000 readers and was operating on a shoestring.

Harlan Ellison and Lawrence Lipton were the paper's first regular columnists.

=== Distribution ===
Because of free speech rules, newspaper publishers could buy vending machines, mount them on street corners chained to posts, and sell their issues directly to the public. Don Campbell, a Free Press editor, bought three vending machines for $125 and stocked them with papers. With the proceeds, he bought three more machines. Pat Woolley, later to operate Sawyer Press and the syndicate that handled Ron Cobb, took the papers around to her head shop clients and sold them by hand to drivers cruising the Sunset Strip.

People were willing to pay 25 cents for the Free Press, even though readers could get mainstream dailies such as the Los Angeles Times for ten cents back then. The cry at the corner was "Don't be a Creep, Buy a Freep!" Randy Meisner, later a founding member of the Eagles, sold copies of the paper on the street, making about five dollars a day.

=== Gaining influence ===
In 1966, the Free Press became one of the five founding members of the Underground Press Syndicate, what eventually became a network of 600 community, student, and alternative newspapers throughout the United States. Jerry Farber's inflammatory essay about the status of students at California State University, "The Student as Nigger," was published in the Free Press in 1967; thanks to the Underground Press Syndicate, it was subsequently reprinted in over 500 underground papers and was published in book form in 1969.

In the summer of 1967, the Free Press published a special issue devoted solely to coverage of the 1967 Century City demonstration, otherwise known as the "1967 Century City police riots", including photos and testimony from witnesses.

The Free Press attained a degree of notoriety in and out of the underground with its coverage of the Charles Manson case. Like its rival counterculture publication Rolling Stone, the Free Press initially supported Manson in its coverage of the infamous murder case, contending that it was a case of the conservative-minded authorities framing "some poor hippie guru". The Free Press put Manson on the cover for three consecutive weeks in early 1970, and Manson himself later wrote a weekly column for the paper from jail. (Later, Ed Sanders covered the Manson trial for the Free Press, the articles from which forming the basis for his book The Family.)

By this time, the Los Angeles Free Press was seemingly at its zenith, with Kunkin controlling a small publishing empire, including three Free Press bookstores in Los Angeles, a typesetting plant, a printing company, and a book publishing firm. There were 150 employees and annual revenues of two million dollars.

=== 1969–1970 upheavals and the end of the Kunkin era ===
In spite of its apparent ascension, however, the business was awash in red ink. The paper had begun to rely more and more heavily on sex ads for its revenues, and fell into debt after Kunkin bought two expensive Mergenthaler printing presses.

In November 1969, Free Press reporter Jerry Applebaum and a group of staffers, including Alex Apostolides, left en masse after disagreements with Kunkin, to found their own paper, called Tuesday's Child. Shortly thereafter, after Kunkin failed to make an employee tax payment in 1970, the paper was seized by the Internal Revenue Service and temporarily shut down. At this point, much of the newspaper's remaining staff and then-editor Brian Kirby left the paper and began another competing newspaper, called The Staff.

The split in the staff began a downward spiral for the Free Press. Kunkin borrowed $60,000, putting up the paper's name and logo as collateral. The note was cosigned by Marvin Miller, a major Los Angeles County sex industry publisher who both advertised in the paper and allowed Kunkin to use his presses after he lost his original printers. In 1971, Kunkin defaulted and the loan was foreclosed, and Miller became the new owner of the paper. He, in turn, sold the paper to Troy Boal and Don Partrick of San Diego, who formed New Way Enterprises, Ltd. to publish the Free Press.

Kunkin stayed on as editor until he was fired in August 1973. At this point, contributors and columnists included Jay Robert Nash, Chuck Stone, Nicholas von Hoffman, Ralph Nader, Charles Bukowski, Alicia Sandoval, and I. F. Stone.

After he lost the Free Press, Kunkin started another competing paper called the Los Angeles Weekly News, with much the same tone as the original Free Press — and many original contributors, including Harlan Ellison, Ron Cobb, and Gilbert Shelton's The Fabulous Furry Freak Brothers strip. (Note: A writer for the American Library Association's Social Responsibilities Round Table newsletter had this to say about the firing of Kunkin and his subsequent startup of the Los Angeles Weekly News: It can be put succinctly: the old Los Angeles Free Press, pioneer "underground" rag and one-time vehicle for such alternative spirits, agitators, and wonder-workers as Ed Badajos, Ron Cobb, Earl Ofari, Anne Draper, Tim Leary, Allen Ginsberg, Harlan Ellison, Liza Williams, Ed Sanders, Jerry Rubin, and Paul Krassner, is DEAD. To clarify: it's still published weekly. But it ain't the same. Swollen with a pull-out, rip-off middle-section of sexist classifieds and now featuring quasi-"acceptable" syndicated columns by Jay Robert Nash, Chuck Stone, Nicholas von Hoffman, and Ralph Nader, the tabloid's become a money-grubbing, almost colorless rival to the L.A. Times. Moreover, the publishers dismissed founder-editor Art Kunkin, who however "freaky" and mercuric — is a guy who can write and who's definitely got what might be termed "alternative soul." His replacement: a prosaic, unimaginative hack named Jerry Goldberg, who obviously and completely toadies to his profit-obsessed bosses, New Way Enterprises. Yet there's a redeeming aspect to this otherwise grim scene, for Kunkin didn't just stagger whimperingly away. instead, with much of the original Freep staff, he began a new sheet, the LOS ANGELES WEEKLY NEWS, which carries TV-listings rather than massage-parlor promos, continues the Freep's muckraking tradition, and runs Cobb cartoons, "The Fabulous Furry Freak Brothers," Harlan Ellison's "Hornbook" (a column of consistently grabby, bravura writing), and fine book/disc/theater/film reviews. So the old Freep is "dead" but lately reborn as the alive-and-scrapping WEEKLY NEWS. The "message" here for libraries is that if they've been dutifully subscribing to the Free Press as a genuine example of counter-culture journalism, they'd be well-advised to drop that sub, replacing it with the WEEKLY NEWS ($8 p.a. from 5401 Santa Monica Blvd., Los Angeles, CA 90029). Should any doubts arise re this admittedly severe Freep put-down — even admitting that Bukowski's "Notes of a Dirty Old Man" remain and that columns by Nader, Sandoval, and Stone often make good reading — consider the further fact that New Way's rag candidly proclaims that "National and international news is provided by the Capitol Hill News Service and the London Express," while the WEEKLY NEWS proudly announces its membership in the Alternative Press Syndicate, Liberation News Service, Zodiac News Service, New York News Service, and Intergalactic World Brain. Yea, by their syndicate & news-service plug-ins ye shall know them... — S. Berman) The LA Weekly News didn't last, however, going out of business after only three or four issues.

=== Post-Kunkin era ===
The paper's new owners, New Way Enterprises, decided to overhaul the Free Press to "reflect [its] original community orientation." Following Kunkin, several others in succession took on the role of chief editor. At this point, the paper's editorial and production staff comprised 15 people, with a freelance pool of 25 contributors. Executive editor Penelope Grenoble — who also served as chief editor in 1974–1975 — also wrote a weekly book column. LGBT activist Jeanne Córdova was Human Rights Editor of the Free Press from 1973 to 1976. During this period, the paper won two Los Angeles Press Club Awards for Investigative Reporting.

Eventually, however, the Los Angeles Free Press became little more than a wraparound for sex ads and massage parlors. In the summer of 1976 the publishers separated out the sex section and sold it as a stand-alone publication called the Freep. This experiment didn't last long, however, as the paper was sold once again in July 1976 to H.A.J., Inc., and a former adult movie performer with no editorial experience came on as chief editor.

The Free Press survived until the late 1970s, when it was purchased by Hustler magazine publisher Larry Flynt, who found it unprofitable and soon shut it down. The paper's final publisher/editor was Jay Levin, later the founder of LA Weekly. The Free Press's last issue was dated April 3, 1978.

== Attempted revivals ==
=== 1989 ===
In 1989, a Los Angeles County resident by the name of José B. Viloria Jr., M.D., registered the Los Angeles Free Press as a California Stock Corporation with the Secretary of State of California, listing the company's principal address in San Dimas. The permit expired, however, in 1992, and it does not appear that anything resulted from this venture.

=== 1999 revival ===
"In 1998, spurned on by the November elections, Kunkin resurrected the Free Press. The revival was short-lived."

=== 2005 revival ===
The Los Angeles Free Press
- Type: Newspaper
- Format: alternative weekly
- Founder: Art Kunkin
- Publisher: Steven M. Finger
- Founded: 2005
- Ceased publication: 2007
- Headquarters: Los Angeles, California
- Website: www.losangelesfreepress.com

In 2005, Kunkin spearheaded a successful revival of the Los Angeles Free Press, albeit with an entirely new staff. On 13 September 2005, the premier issue of the revived Freep was published and distributed — the revived publication's slogan was "We're Back. The True alternative to the corporate-controlled media." The print version was published in the original five-column format with the "screamer" headlines of old. It included both current and vintage content in both the articles and ads. The look of the paper was true to its original format.

The new version of the Freep was embodied with a constant online presence and with separate sites for politics and music, as well as "pop-ups" of print editions — as when it was distributed without warning at nearly 100 locations within L.A. — as well as in New York, Washington, D.C., and Atlanta.

The new Free Press embodied many of the same independent ideals and beliefs of the original paper. It covered politics, health (including natural and/or holistic), spirituality, literature, media, food, and community issues. The Los Angeles Free Press was always intended to be a catalyst for social change. The paper took a stand against the Iraq War. The basis of the paper's beliefs was that names and locations may have changed but the issues concerning personal rights and the action of an unjust war were the same as during the Vietnam War era.

Later, the Free Press gave Tom Hayden a lifetime achievement award for his efforts as an activist, both in his private life and during his 18 years in politics.

Steven M. Finger became the publisher of The Los Angeles Free Press in late 2006/early 2007. Finger also owned and managed AP&G, the paper's marketing arm.

The revived Los Angeles Free Press went out of business in 2007, although Finger kept the website LosAngelesFreePress.com active, with archives of past editions available to view for historical reference and/or research.

Art Kunkin died in Joshua Tree, California on April 30, 2019, at the age of 91.

=== 2020 revival ===
In 2020, Steven M. Finger and photographer Zach Lowry once again attempted to revive a print edition of the Los Angeles Free Press; by late 2022 that effort had also shut down.

== Trivia ==
The 1968 comedy film I Love You, Alice B. Toklas features Peter Sellers as a straight-laced lawyer who changes his ways and becomes a hippie, hawking copies of the Free Press .

The final issue of the Los Angeles Free Press is featured in Paul Schrader's 1979 film, Hardcore, where George C. Scott's Jake Van Dorn character places an advertisement of himself as a porn producer in order to find his missing daughter.

== Archives ==
The Los Angeles Free Press archives are in the holdings of California State University, Dominguez Hills' Leo F. Cain Library and Gerth Archives.

== See also ==
- LA Weekly
- List of underground newspapers of the 1960s counterculture
- Chicano Liberation Front
