= Cafe Frankenstein =

Coffee house in Laguna Beach, California, US

Coordinates: 33°32′49″N 117°47′47″W

The Café Frankenstein was a coffee house in Laguna Beach, California, United States.

From 1958 to 1962, the Café Frankenstein was seen as sort of a "den of iniquity" amongst the semi-conservative Orange County, California art community of Laguna Beach. Located at 860 South Pacific Coast Highway, Cafe Frankenstein boasted a steady diet of beats, surfers, folkies, teens and all manner of weirdos, and was suspected of harboring drugs and other debauchery. For two years straight, a pair of undercover cops were regulars at the Frankenstein, looking for a bust. But according to the last owner, Michael Schley, they instead became avid supporters.

Artists Burt Shonberg, Doug Myres (the Gateway Singers) and writer George Clayton Johnson (Twilight Zone, Logan's Run) were the proprietors. Shonberg provided a Frankenstein stained-glass window and cubist mural art for the club. Shonberg also painted murals for Hollywood's Purple Onion, Cosmo Alley, the Bastille, the Seven Chef's and Pandora's Box, as well as advertising art for Fairfax Avenue's Sandalsville, Don Brown's local surf movie events and a coterie of album covers (including Arthur Lee & Love's 1969 LP Out Here).

The Frankenstein had a bookstore inside, specializing in banned books. There was a sandal shop in the back, as well. Sid Soffer managed the Café Frankenstein from 1958 to 1959, before starting his own beat café, Sid's Blue Beet (Newport Beach).

== Controversy ==
The Frankenstein's steady diet of controversy started early, with police busts for spiking the espresso with brandy and for allowing a woman to be photographed nude against the inside murals. Both charges were eventually dropped, but the damage had been done. The last straw was when the local ladies Church League came down on them for creating a stained-glass window of the Frankenstein monster. The Church League claimed that stained glass was only for use in the church, and rallied the community against the Frankenstein. Owner Burt Shonberg threatened to erect a crucified Frankenstein dummy in front of the coffeehouse, if they didn't back off. They did back off, but it became harder to get kids in the door, as parents forbade them from going in.

== Music and clientele ==
Folk and Jazz music emanated from the inside out onto the porch, with singers such as Judy Henske, Steve Gillette (who later wrote songs for the Stone Poneys) and Lee Mallory (later with Sagittarius, Millennium) performing here during the early '60s. Dave Myers sang folk songs at Café Frankenstein before forming his Del-Fi surf band, Dave Myers & the Surf-Tones. Comedian Lord Buckley performed here. Famous photographer Lewis Baltz was also an early regular.

== Conversion to the 860 Club ==
In 1960, Cafe Frankenstein was sold to Connie Vining and her husband, Michael Schley (who previously ran the sandal shop) and became the 860 Club. All of the murals remained intact, and the club continued to host folk music and various beat performance art, but the proto-punk antics were abandoned. In 1962, the land was bought out by the owner of the next-door restaurant, who demolished it and converted the space into a parking lot.

== See also ==
- List of defunct restaurants of the United States
