= The Student as Nigger =

- Author: Jerry Farber
- Publication date: 1969

The Student as Nigger is the title of an essay and subsequent book by American educator Jerry Farber.

== Publication history ==
The essay first appeared in the Los Angeles Free Press in 1967 and is often cited as one of the first underground publications to receive widespread recognition. It was reprinted over 500 times in the 1960s and was published in book form in 1969 by Contact Books and in 1970 by Pocket Books.

== Synopsis ==
The essay, published during the height of the Civil Rights Movement, in which Farber was an active participant, draws an extended analogy between the status of students at California State University and the status of African Americans.

Farber uses the term "nigger" in the title to connote what he perceived as a "master-slave" relationship in modern educational settings in which students were overly constrained and intellectually de-motivated.
