= Frank Alesia =

American actor (1944–2011)

- Born: Frank Alesia; January 4, 1944; Chicago, Illinois, U.S.
- Died: February 27, 2011 (aged 67); Carlsbad, California, U.S.

Frank Alesia (January 4, 1944 – February 27, 2011) was an American actor and television director. He was best known for his work in the beach party film genre during the 1960s, including such films as Pajama Party (1964) and Riot on Sunset Strip (1967). He later directed episodes of Captain Kangaroo and other television series.

== Background and career ==
Alesia was born in Chicago, Illinois, and moved to Los Angeles in 1964. According to The Hollywood Reporter, Alesia became one of the last character actors in the film industry to work under the studio system, which was declining at the time. He appeared in several beach party films of the 1960s, including Pajama Party, Bikini Beach, which starred Frankie Avalon and Annette Funicello, Riot on Sunset Strip and Beach Blanket Bingo. His television credits as an actor also included appearances in The Flying Nun, The Odd Couple, Gomer Pyle, That Girl, Room 222 and Laverne & Shirley.

=== 1960s ===
His earliest role was as a surfer in William Asher's Bikini Beach, released in 1964. He also appeared in the beach party films Pajama Party in 1964 and Beach Blanket Bingo in 1965.

=== 1970s to 1980s ===
In 1970, Alesia appeared in Stanley Kramer's R. P. M., a provocative film for its time, one that portrays student outrage at the issues surrounding the Vietnam war. Along with Henry Brown, Jose Brad and Teda Bracci, he was one of the students.

Alesia later directed episodes of Captain Kangaroo, which earned him a Daytime Emmy nomination in 1979. He also joined the crew of Laverne & Shirley beginning in 1980 as both a screenwriter and television director. He directed three episodes of Laverne & Shirley, wrote one episode, and served as an executive consultant for eight episodes of the show.

He later left the entertainment industry and raced and bred thoroughbred horses.

== Audio recordings ==
- Frank Alesia & Timothy Blake - Forgive Me Father, I Have Sinned - Laff Records Laff-LP A-171

== Death ==
Frank Alesia died of natural causes at his home in Carlsbad, California, on February 27, 2011, aged 67. He was survived by his wife, Sharon Mae (Lubin), the former spouse of musician Herb Alpert, whom he had wedded in 1983.

== Filmography ==
Year	Title	Role	Notes
1964	Bikini Beach	Surfer #4	
1964	Pajama Party	Pajama Boy	
1964	The Disorderly Orderly	Interne	Uncredited
1965	Beach Blanket Bingo	Beach Boy	
1966	The Ghost in the Invisible Bikini	Frank	
1967	C'mon, Let's Live a Little	Balta	
1967	Riot on Sunset Strip	Joel	
1968	Maryjane	Frenchy	
1970	R. P. M.	Student #9	
