= Ron Cobb =

American-Australian cartoonist (1937–2020)

- Born: Ronald Ray Cobb; September 21, 1937; Los Angeles, California
- Died: September 21, 2020 (aged 83); Sydney, Australia
- Citizenship: United States, Australia
- Website: roncobb.net

Ronald Ray Cobb (September 21, 1937 – September 21, 2020) was an American-Australian artist. In addition to his work as an editorial cartoonist, he contributed concept art to major films including Dark Star (1974), Star Wars (1977), Alien (1979), Raiders of the Lost Ark (1981), Conan the Barbarian (1982), Back to the Future (1985), The Abyss (1989), Total Recall (1990), and Southland Tales (2006). He had one credit as director, for the 1992 film Garbo.

Cobb also created a symbol which was later featured on the Ecology Flag.

== Early life ==
Ronald Ray "Ron" Cobb was born in Los Angeles, and spent most of his life in Sydney.

== Career ==
=== Early work ===
By the age of 18, with no formal training in graphic illustration, Cobb was working as an animation "inbetweener" artist for Disney Studios in Burbank, California. He progressed to becoming a breakdown artist on the animation feature Sleeping Beauty (1959). It was the last Disney film to have cels inked by hand.

After Sleeping Beauty was completed in 1957, Cobb was laid off by Disney. He spent the next three years in various jobs—mail carrier, assembler in a door factory, sign painter's assistant—until he was drafted into the United States Army in 1960. For the next two years he delivered classified documents around San Francisco, then signed up for an extra year to avoid assignment to the infantry. He was sent to Vietnam in 1963 as a draftsman for the Signal Corps. After his discharge, Cobb began freelancing as an artist, contributing to the Los Angeles Free Press for the first time in 1965.

Edited and published by Art Kunkin, the Los Angeles Free Press was one of the first of the underground newspapers of the 1960s, noted for its radical politics. Cobb's editorial/political cartoons were a celebrated feature of the Freep, and appeared regularly throughout member newspapers of the Underground Press Syndicate. Although he was regarded as one of the finest political cartoonists of the mid-1960s to early 1970s, Cobb made very little money from the cartoons and was always looking for work elsewhere. His cartoons were featured in the back to the land magazine Mother Earth News.

Among other projects, Cobb designed the cover for Jefferson Airplane's 1967 album, After Bathing at Baxter's.

His cartoons from the 1960s and 1970s are collected in RCD-25 (1967) and Mah Fellow Americans (1968) (both Sawyer Press), and Raw Sewage (1971) and My Fellow Americans (1971) (both Price/Stern/Sloan). None of these volumes remain in print.

Ecology Flag

In 1969, Cobb designed the Ecology symbol, later incorporated into the Ecology Flag.

=== Move to Sydney ===
In 1972, Cobb moved to Sydney, where his work appeared in alternative magazines such as The Digger. Independent publishers Wild & Woolley published a "best of" collection of the earlier cartoon books, The Cobb Book, in 1975. A follow-up volume, Cobb Again, appeared in 1978.

Cobb is credited with designing the "Hammerhead" creature seen in the 1977 film Star Wars.

Cobb returned to cinema work when he worked with Dan O'Bannon to design the eponymous spaceship for the 1973 cult film, Dark Star (he drew the original design for the exterior of the Dark Star spaceship on a Pancake House napkin). After contributing designs for Alejandro Jodorowsky's uncompleted film adaptation of Frank Herbert's novel Dune, Cobb was engaged by Lucasfilm to produce concept art for the space fantasy film Star Wars (1977). Working alongside artists John Mollo and Ralph McQuarrie, he created the designs for a number of exotic alien creatures for the Mos Eisley cantina scene.

In 1981, Colorvision, a large-format, full-color monograph appeared, including much of his design work for the films Star Wars (1977), Alien (1979), and Conan the Barbarian (1982), the first feature for which he received the credit of production designer. Cobb has also contributed production design to the films The Last Starfighter (1984), Leviathan (1989), Total Recall (1990) (and also appeared in the film in a brief cameo), True Lies (1994), The Sixth Day (2000), Cats & Dogs (2001), Southland Tales (2006), and the Australian feature Garbo, which he directed.

Cobb contributed the initial story for Night Skies, an earlier, darker version of E.T. Steven Spielberg offered him the opportunity to direct this scarier sequel to Close Encounters of the Third Kind until problems arose over special effects that required a major rewrite. While Cobb was in Spain working on Conan the Barbarian, Spielberg supervised the rewrite into the more personal E.T. and ended up directing it himself. Cobb later received some net profit participation.

In 1985, Cobb received credit as "DeLorean Time Travel Consultant" for the film Back to the Future.

During the early 1990s, Cobb worked with Rocket Science Games. His designs can be seen in Loadstar: The Legend of Tully Bodine (1994) and The Space Bar (1997), in which he designed all the characters. His work made a greater and indelible impact in video gaming because of his art's direct influence on the artists and designers who developed the Halo: Combat Evolved blockbuster series, itself one of the most influential video games of all time.

Cobb co-wrote with his wife, Robin Love, one of the Twilight Zone episodes, "Shelter Skelter" (1987).

Cobb designed the Father's Sword and the Atlantean Sword for the 1982 film Conan the Barbarian. Cobb's original drawings of the swords are now used, in cinema merchandising, to mass-produce and sell replicas.

=== Death ===
Ron Cobb died on his 83rd birthday, September 21, 2020, from complications of Lewy body dementia.

== See also ==
- List of editorial cartoonists
