= Harvey Kubernik =

American author and journalist

- Born: February 26, 1951 (age 75); Los Angeles, California, United States
- Education: San Diego State University
- Occupations: Author, music journalist
- Writing career
- Genres: Popular music, pop culture

Harvey Kubernik (born February 26, 1951) is an American author, journalist and music historian. From the mid-1970s, he wrote for music publications such as Melody Maker, Los Angeles Free Press, Crawdaddy! and Phonograph Record. His articles, interviews and reviews have since been published in many other music magazines, including Goldmine, Mojo, Musician, Classic Rock, DISCoveries, Uncut, Mix, Harp and Hits, and in the Los Angeles Times. During the 1970s and early 1980s, he also worked as an A&R director for MCA Records and as a record producer.

As of July 2017, Kubernik was a contributing editor at Record Collector News magazine and had written ten books on popular music. His books include Hollywood Shack Job: Rock Music in Film and on Your Screen (2007), Canyon of Dreams (2009), It Was 50 Years Ago Today: The Beatles Invade America and Hollywood (2014), and 1967: A Complete Rock Music History of the Summer of Love (2017).

== Early life, music journalism and record production ==
Harvey Kubernik was born in Los Angeles. He attended Fairfax High School and West Los Angeles College, and graduated from San Diego State University with a B.A. Special Major Degree (Health, Sociology, Literature). He began his career in music journalism in 1972. He later recalled that his attending a pre-tour press conference in Los Angeles for George Harrison's 1974 North American tour helped establish him professionally. A junior contributor to Los Angeles Free Press at the time, Kubernik offered a report of the press conference to Melody Maker editor Ray Coleman, in London, which led to a front-page story and weekly assignments for the British magazine from 1975 to 1980.

He also worked as an A&R director for MCA Records and, from 1979, as a record producer. In the period up to 1981, he played percussion on recordings by the Runaways for producer Kim Fowley and on Phil Spector's productions of albums by Leonard Cohen, the Paley Brothers, and the Ramones. Kubernik went on to produce over 50 albums of spoken word, poetry and music.

== As music historian ==
Kubernik's writing has been included in books such as The Rolling Stone Book of the Beats and Drinking with Bukowski. He has contributed liner note essays for several CD reissue campaigns and in 2006 was a featured speaker on audiotape preservation and archiving at the special hearings called by the Library of Congress.

His first book was This Is Rebel Music, subtitled The Harvey Kubernik InnerViews and published in 2004 by University of New Mexico Press. He subsequently wrote the 2007 book Hollywood Shack Job: Rock Music in Film and on Your Screen.

In 2009, Kubernik's book Canyon of Dreams was published by Sterling and Barnes & Noble. It details the Laurel Canyon music community of Los Angeles and incorporates the photography of Henry Diltz, it includes very important pictures of Sunset Blvd; like the Whisky a GO-GO contributed by Samuel L. Biedny, taken in the late 1960s. Other books by Kubernik include A Perfect Haze: The Illustrated History of the Monterey International Pop Festival, It Was 50 Years Ago Today: The Beatles Invade America and Hollywood, and Turn Up the Radio! Rock, Pop, and Roll in Los Angeles 1956–1972. His 2017 book 1967: A Complete Rock Music History of the Summer of Love documents the Summer of Love.
