= 1967 Century City anti-Vietnam War march =

Anti-war march and police riot

Century City anti-Vietnam War march
- Part of the anti-Vietnam War movement
- Date: June 23, 1967
- Location: Century City, California, United States

Parties
LAPD	Anti-war protesters

The 1967 Century City anti-Vietnam War march, also known as the 1967 Century City police riot, was an anti-Vietnam War protest march which took place on June 23, 1967, in the Century City neighborhood of Los Angeles. Beginning with a demonstration against the war by an estimated 10,000 people, the march was soon halted by a contingent of Los Angeles Police (LAPD) officers who began assaulting the protesters, later claiming that they believed a mob was forming. In the end, 51 arrests were made and an unknown number of protesters were left injured.

== Background ==
The city of Los Angeles had seen demonstrations in the years preceding with antagonism towards police backlash following the Watts rebellion. The Sunset Strip curfew riots, where police and protesters had clashed due to a curfew on youth-and-counterculture-related venues, had shaken the city and influenced the culture. Earlier that year, on February 11, a major gay rights demonstration took place outside the Black Cat, a gay bar which was frequently raided and harassed by LAPD. The protest was in response to a raid made on New Year's Eve where several patrons had been arrested, and made reference to police antagonism, harassment and violence against LGBT people in the city. At the same time as these events, the movement against the Vietnam War began to increase in size; in Los Angeles by 1966, at least one protest had been held by draftees against the war outside military recruitment offices. President Lyndon B. Johnson, at the same time, had begun escalation of the war, and was set to work on reelection.

== March and violence ==
The march began with a rally in Rancho Park, where anti-war speakers such as Muhammad Ali, H. Rap Brown, and Benjamin Spock talked before the actual march towards the hotel began. By the early evening, Johnson was at the Century Plaza Hotel, attending a $1,000-a-plate fundraiser dinner for his reelection, while the anti-war demonstration began and marched towards the hotel. The LAPD present were taken by surprise, expecting only between 1,000 and 2,000 protesters, while being unprepared for the estimated 10,000 who arrived. The original permit and plan had been to march up Pico Blvd., past the hotel on the Avenue of the Stars, before turning onto Santa Monica Boulevard, but changed when several marchers sat down in the street north of Olympic. Protest organizers later claimed that they were agent provocateurs.

The LAPD admitted later that there were indeed several undercover agents hired to be present. With information from the undercover operatives, LAPD chief Tom Reddin, on the pretext of believing that an assault on the hotel was imminent, ordered the crowd dispersed. After several dispersal orders were issued, police began moving in with nightsticks and attacking protesters, many of whom were not resisting or fighting back. One demonstrator and eyewitness later described seeing a scene of injured protesters fleeing, making their way down to Olympic on a steep embankment, which was one of the few ways to escape as nightstick-wielding police waded in.

== Aftermath ==
After the riot, the Los Angeles Free Press published a special issue devoted solely to coverage of what happened, including photos and testimony from witnesses, and would continue to report on and against police brutality, covering topics such as the death of journalist Ruben Salazar and publishing the names of undercover drug enforcement operatives, until its closure in 1978.

In later years, Reddin would claim that intelligence reports the department received said that the demonstrators would lead to civil disobedience and in his eyes required a sterner response, denying provable brutality but acknowledging that protesters were "thumped". Ed Davis, who replaced Reddin as LAPD chief two years later, was shocked by the department's conduct while deputy chief, and complained to Reddin, who did not recall later.

The demonstration's co-leaders disagreed on what caused the march to break down, with Donald Kalish claiming that Irving Sarnoff and others had radicalized the march without his knowledge, while Sarnoff maintained that nothing happened to reasonably justify the police response, and that the march would have resumed had police not intervened.

The next day, the Los Angeles Times printed a largely pro-police account of what happened. Many in the march, who were seen more as middle-class liberals, were angry both at the police and the march's organizers for putting them in a dangerous situation.

By 1969, Sarnoff and Kalish were signatories of a letter by the Cleveland Area Peace Action Council calling for a national anti-war conference on July 4 of that year. Protests against the war in Vietnam in the area would grow in the years after Century City, such as the Chicano Moratorium gaining over 20,000 marchers.

Recalling the events decades later, Kenneth Reich of the Los Angeles Times stated that "[t]he bloody, panicked clash that ensued left an indelible mark on politics, protests and police relations. It marked a turning point for Los Angeles, a city not known for drawing demonstrators to marches in sizable numbers," while also claiming the riot "foreshadowed the explosive growth of the national antiwar movement and its inevitable confrontations with police," and "shaped the movement’s rising militancy." It was often seen as an early "battleground" in the anti-war movement which later entered more the national consciousness with events such as police attacking demonstrators at the 1968 Democratic National Convention. Johnson rarely campaigned outside of areas deemed safe until his announcement to not run for reelection.

Steve Nichols, a participant in the march, later stated that "[t]he 1967 march was significant in bringing Black and Chicano activists into common cause with their liberal white counterparts", and in their history Set the Night on Fire, Mike Davis and Jon Weiner stated that the event exposed white Westside residents to police brutality that Black and Mexican communities had long been experiencing.

== See also ==
- Sunset Strip curfew riots
