= Timothy Blake =

American actress

- Occupation: Actress
- Years active: 1966 to 1998
- Known for: SAG Women's Conference Committee chairwoman

Timothy Blake is an actress whose career was active from the mid-1960s until the late 1990s. The films she has appeared in include, Adam at 6 A.M., They Went That-A-Way & That-A-Way, Who'll Stop the Rain, and Finders Keepers. She has also appeared in television shows such as The Ropers.

== Background ==
During her time she has been the national chairwoman of SAG's Women's Conference Committee. As head of The Screen Actors Guild Women's Committee, she has been vocal about sexual harassment that actresses endure from their bosses. She has also been vocal about the fewer roles available to older women.

== Career ==
=== 1960s ===
One of her earliest roles was in 1966, appearing as a waitress in "Fanciful Frail", which was an episode of Perry Mason. The following year she appeared as a cigarette girl in a Gomer Pyle, U.S.M.C. episode, " Friendly Freddy Strikes Again". In 1968, she had a role as Lila in "Here Comes the Bribe" which was an episode of Good Morning World a sitcom about morning radio disk jockeys, starring Ronnie Schell. In 1969 she had a part as The Dominos in the Claude Lelouch directed film Un homme qui me plaît aka Love Is a Funny Thing.

=== 1970s ===
1970 saw her appear in Love, American Style as Suzy in the episode, "Love And The King" and The Odd Couple in the episode "Oscar's Ulcer" as Marilyn. The following year she had a part as Mavis in "The Chess Game" which was an episode of The Good Life. Also that year she appeared in the Burt Kennedy directed film, Dirty Dingus Magee which starred Frank Sinatra, George Kennedy and Anne Jackson. The following year she appeared as Mavis in "The Chess Game", an episode of The Good Life, a series starring Larry Hagman and Donna Mills. The following year she appeared in a Henry Hathaway film, Hangup playing the part of Gwen. In 1973, a comedy record, Forgive Me Father, I Have Sinned... featuring Blake with Frank Alesia was released on the Laff Records label. In 1974 Ms Blake had a co-starring role as"Marilyn" in the episode of "Emergency! titled "The Parade" In 1975 Blake appeared as Cindy in the first-season episode of Starsky & Hutch titled "Lady Blue".

=== 1980s ===
In 1980, she played the part of Sally in Gerald Mater's CBS Afternoon Playhouse aka One Last Ride, a five part story which starred Ronny Cox, David Hollander and Carmen Zapata. Around 1987, she co-founded Quince/Blake Productions with Ed Asner.

=== 1990s ===
In 1991, she appeared in Season Two of Beverly Hills, 90210 as Mrs. Rattinger. She played Dr Rhammy in the 1998 made-for-television film, Twice Upon a Time which was directed by Thom Eberhardt.

== Later years ==
In 2014, she was hosting and moderating a Q&A session after the screening of Applause at Aero Theatre in Santa Monica, California. It was reported by Deadline Hollywood in its February 6, 2015 issue that she was set for SAG-AFTRA's Ralph Morgan Award.

== Audio recordings ==
- Frank Alesia & Timothy Blake - Forgive Me Father, I Have Sinned - Laff Records Laff-LP A-171
