= Shindig! =

American musical variety series

- Genre: Musical variety
- Created by: Jack Good
- Written by: Jimmy O'Neill
- Directed by: Richard Dunlap; Selwyn Touber; Dean Whitmore; Jørn Winther
- Presented by: Jimmy O'Neill
- Country of origin: United States
- Original language: English
- No. of seasons: 2

Production
- Executive producers: Selig J. Seligman; Leon Mirell
- Producer: Phillip Browning
- Camera setup: Multi-camera
- Running time: 24–26 minutes (September 1964–January 1965); 48–52 minutes (January–Fall 1965)
- Production companies: American Broadcasting Company; Selmur Productions; Circle Seven Productions

Original release
- Network: ABC
- Release: September 16, 1964 – January 8, 1966

Shindig! is an American musical variety series which aired on ABC from September 16, 1964 to January 8, 1966. The show was hosted by Jimmy O'Neill, a disc jockey in Los Angeles, who created the show along with his wife Sharon Sheeley, British producer Jack Good, and production executive Art Stolnitz. The original pilot was rejected by ABC and David Sontag, then executive producer of ABC, redeveloped and completely redesigned the show. A new pilot with a new cast of artists was shot starring Sam Cooke. That pilot aired as the premiere episode.

== Synopsis ==
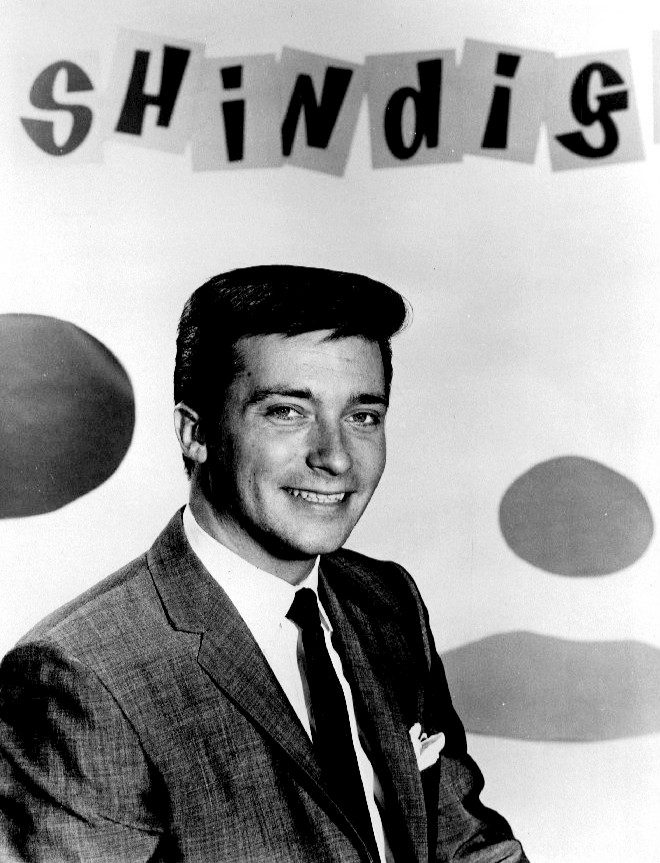
Jimmy O'Neill on the set of Shindig!, 1964.

Shindig! was conceived as a short-notice replacement for Hootenanny, a series which specialized in folk revival music. The folk revival had fizzled in 1964 as the result of the British Invasion, which damaged the ratings for Hootenanny and prompted that show's cancellation.

Shindig! focused on a broader variety of popular music than its predecessor and first aired for a half-hour every Wednesday evening, but was expanded to an hour in January 1965. In the fall of 1965, the show split into two half-hour telecasts, on Thursday and Saturday nights.

The premiere episode was actually the second pilot of Shindig!, and it featured Sam Cooke, The Everly Brothers, and The Righteous Brothers. Later shows featured performances taped in Britain: a set was used at Twickenham Film Studios, where British acts performed live for the cameras, with the resultant footage flown back to the United States, to be shown on the program. The first UK episode had The Beatles as the guests. The series later featured other "British invasion" bands and performers including The Who, The Rolling Stones, and Cilla Black. Shindig! continued to broadcast episodes with footage shot in London throughout its run. This meant many acts were seen on U.S television before they actually went to America (The Who in particular, who performed a unique early version of "My Generation" live, two months before the single version was recorded).

Many other popular performers of the day played on Shindig! including Tina Turner, Lesley Gore, Bo Diddley, Sonny and Cher, The Beach Boys, James Brown, Jackie Wilson, The Supremes, and The Ronettes.

Shindig!'s success prompted NBC to air the similar series Hullabaloo starting in January 1965 and other producers to launch syndicated rock music shows like Shivaree and Hollywood a Go-Go.

In March 1965, Little Eva performed a live but short version of her hit song "The Loco-Motion". This is the only known video clip of her singing it.

Toward the end of the program's run, The Mamas and the Papas appeared in an episode featuring Barry McGuire. Although serving as his backup singers, the group introduced "California Dreamin'" on that program, which launched its career.

Shindig! is one of the few rock music shows of the era to still have all episodes available to watch.

== Final season ==
In September 1965, the show was moved out of its Wednesday-night time slot (where it gave The Beverly Hillbillies its first serious competition in its time period among younger viewers), and split into two half-hours on new days and times (Thursdays and Saturdays at 7:30 P.M. Eastern time). The show faced tough competition from Daniel Boone and The Munsters on Thursdays along with Flipper and The Jackie Gleason Show on Saturdays. Additionally, the Saturday edition aired in a time period when many of its potential viewers were going out and, thus, not at home to watch television. By October 1965, the show was having ratings problems (Time magazine said "early-season tide [was] running against the teen scene"), and in January 1966, Shindig! was cancelled and replaced in its Thursday time slots by Batman.

== Series regulars ==
Shindig! also featured a dance troupe choreographed by David Winters and André Tayir, who accompanied the music acts of the week (Winters later worked on the competing NBC show Hullabaloo). One of the regular dancers was Teri Garr, who went on to find success as an actress. Others included Anita Mann, Maria Gahva, Lorene Yarnell (later of the mime team Shields and Yarnell), Diane Stuart, Pam Freeman, Gina Trikinis, Marianna Picora, Virginia Justus, Rini Jarmon and Carol Shelyne, who always wore glasses while she danced. Occasionally, a small group of dancers who sang would get a featured spot; this rotating group was billed as The Shindig Girls. The assistant choreographer was Antonia Basilotta, better known as Toni Basil, who later gained fame with her 1980s hit song "Mickey" and appeared in Easy Rider. Both Garr and Basil were dance students of David Winters at the time and worked with him on most of his choreography projects.

The series house band was supposedly known as "The Shin-diggers", but that was actually the name host Jimmy O'Neill used to refer to fans of the show. At first, TV credits identified the musicians simply as the Shindig Band. By early 1965, they'd been renamed Sir Rufus Marion Banks and his Band of Men, but the generic name had returned by the time "Shindig" went off the air. The rhythm section was spun off into a featured group and named the Shindogs. It included Joey Cooper on bass, Chuck Blackwell on drums, James Burton on lead guitar, Delaney Bramlett on rhythm guitar and Glen D. Hardin on keyboards. Cooper and Bramlett traded off lead vocal duties. The larger band featured Jerry Cole on lead guitar, Russ Titelman on rhythm guitar, Larry Knechtel on bass, Leon Russell on piano, Julius Wechter on percussion and Ritchie Frost on drums. Later, Billy Preston took over keyboards and performed as a singing regular. Glen Campbell was not a regular member of this band but a frequent guest performer. Ray Pohlman was the musical director, and he was also one - as was Campbell, Knechtel, Wechter and Russell - of the collection of first-call pop studio musicians that would later be known as "The Wrecking Crew". In some instances when one of the guitarists was unable to work, Pohlman would bring in Bill Aken to fill in.

The Righteous Brothers, Dick and Dee Dee, Jackie and Gayle, Donna Loren, Willy Nelson (not the famous Country singer Willie Nelson) and Bobby Sherman were regular vocalists on the series. Up until July 1965, when he quit the show, producer Jack Good was also a regular, wearing a bowler hat and improvising comedy routines with Jimmy O'Neill at the close of each episode.

The Blossoms, an all-female vocal group featuring Darlene Love, backed up many of the performers and were occasionally featured in spotlight performances. The Wellingtons were a trio of male singers who performed on their own, and as backup singers. Another male group, The Eligibles, sometimes alternated with The Wellingtons on backup.

== Musical guests ==
- Terry Allen
- The Animals
- Louis Armstrong
- Desi Arnaz Jr.
- Long John Baldry
- The Barron Knights
- Fontella Bass
- Shirley Bassey
- The Beach Boys
- The Beatles
- The Blossoms
- James Brown
- The Byrds
- The Beau Brummels
- Tony Bennett
- The Chambers Brothers
- Chuck Berry
- Cilla Black
- Booker T. & the M.G.'s
- Vashti Bunyan
- Glen Campbell
- Freddy Cannon
- Johnny Cash
- Chad & Jeremy
- Ray Charles
- Chubby Checker
- The Clara Ward Singers
- Petula Clark
- The Coasters
- Sam Cooke
- The Dave Clark Five
- Karl Denver
- Jackie DeShannon
- Dick & Dee Dee
- Dino, Desi & Billy
- Bo Diddley
- The Dixie Cups
- Donovan
- The Everly Brothers
- Shelley Fabares
- Adam Faith
- Marianne Faithfull
- The Four Tops
- Aretha Franklin
- Freddie and the Dreamers
- Billy Fury
- Gale Garnett
- Gary Lewis & the Playboys
- Marvin Gaye
- The Gentrys
- Gerry and the Pacemakers
- Stan Getz
- Dizzy Gillespie
- Dobie Gray
- Bessie Griffin
- Bobby Goldsboro
- Lesley Gore
- The Grass Roots
- Ruben Guevara (credited as "J.P. Mobey")
- Françoise Hardy
- Herman's Hermits
- The Hollies
- Don Ho
- Brenda Holloway
- The Honeycombs
- The Ikettes
- The Isley Brothers
- Davy Jones
- Gloria Jones
- The Kingsmen
- The Kinks
- Billy J. Kramer & the Dakotas
- Bettye LaVette
- Major Lance
- Dinah Lee
- Ketty Lester
- Jerry Lee Lewis
- Little Anthony and the Imperials
- Little Eva
- Little Richard
- The Lovin' Spoonful
- Lulu & the Luvvers
- George Maharis
- The Mamas & the Papas
- Manfred Mann
- Martha and the Vandellas
- Melinda Marx
- Johnny Mathis
- Jody Miller
- Sal Mineo
- Matt Monro
- The Moody Blues
- The Nashville Teens
- Ricky Nelson
- The Nooney Rickett 4
- The Olympics
- Roy Orbison
- Rita Pavone
- Peter and Gordon
- Gene Pitney
- The Poets
- The Pretty Things
- P. J. Proby
- Eddie Rambeau
- Roy Head
- Johnny Rivers
- Smokey Robinson and The Miracles
- Jimmie Rodgers
- The Rolling Stones
- The Ronettes
- Mickey Rooney Jr.
- Bobby Rydell
- Tommy Sands
- Neil Sedaka
- Del Shannon
- Dee Dee Sharp
- Sandie Shaw
- The Shangri-Las
- Sir Douglas Quintet
- Sonny & Cher
- George Soulé
- The Spencer Davis Group
- Rod Stewart (as part of Brian Auger and the Trinity)
- The Supremes
- The Temptations
- Joe Tex
- Tommy Tucker
- Ike & Tina Turner
- The Turtles
- Twinkle
- Unit 4 + 2
- Leroy Van Dyke
- Sylvie Vartan
- Bobby Vee
- The Ventures
- The Vibrations
- The Walker Brothers
- We Five
- Clara Ward Singers
- Mary Wells
- The Who
- Hank Williams Jr.
- Joe Williams
- Jackie Wilson
- Howlin' Wolf
- The Yardbirds
- The Zombies

== Celebrity guests ==
- Ted Cassidy as Lurch in Halloween episode
- Patty Duke
- Douglas Fairbanks Jr.
- Rosey Grier
- Tommy Kirk
- Melody Patterson
- Vincent Price
- Alan Sues
- Raquel Welch
- Orson Welles

== Guest hosts ==
- George Chakiris
- Zsa Zsa Gabor
- Carolyn Jones
- Boris Karloff in a Halloween episode
- Hedy Lamarr
- Jack E. Leonard
- Hugh O'Brian
- Mickey Rooney
- Ed Wynn

== VHS release ==
In 1991 and 1992, Rhino Entertainment and WEA released a series of Shindig! Presents VHS videos featuring highlights from the series.

== In popular culture ==
- Shindig! was mentioned in The Ramones song "Do You Remember Rock 'n' Roll Radio?" in the lyric "Do you remember Hullabaloo? Upbeat, Shindig!, and Ed Sullivan too...?"
- Shindig! made an appearance on a December 1965 episode of The Flintstones as "Shinrock!" with host "Jimmy O'Neillstone" (O'Neill provided his own voice). The episode featured musical guests The Beau Brummels, appearing as "The Beau Brummelstones", who performed their hit song "Laugh, Laugh". Fred turns off the show, saying "Let me take care of Jimmy O'Neillstone," whereupon O'Neillstone's hand reaches out from the set and turns it back on. "Well," Barney quips, "that's one way of keeping up their ratings."
- The Shindogs were a rock group parody on an episode of The Patty Duke Show ("Partying Is Such Sweet Sorrow", Sept. 29, 1965), when Patty sang, "Funny Little Butterflies."
