= Sunset Strip curfew riots =

Civil unrest in 1966/7 in West Hollywood, California, USA

- Part of the hippie movement
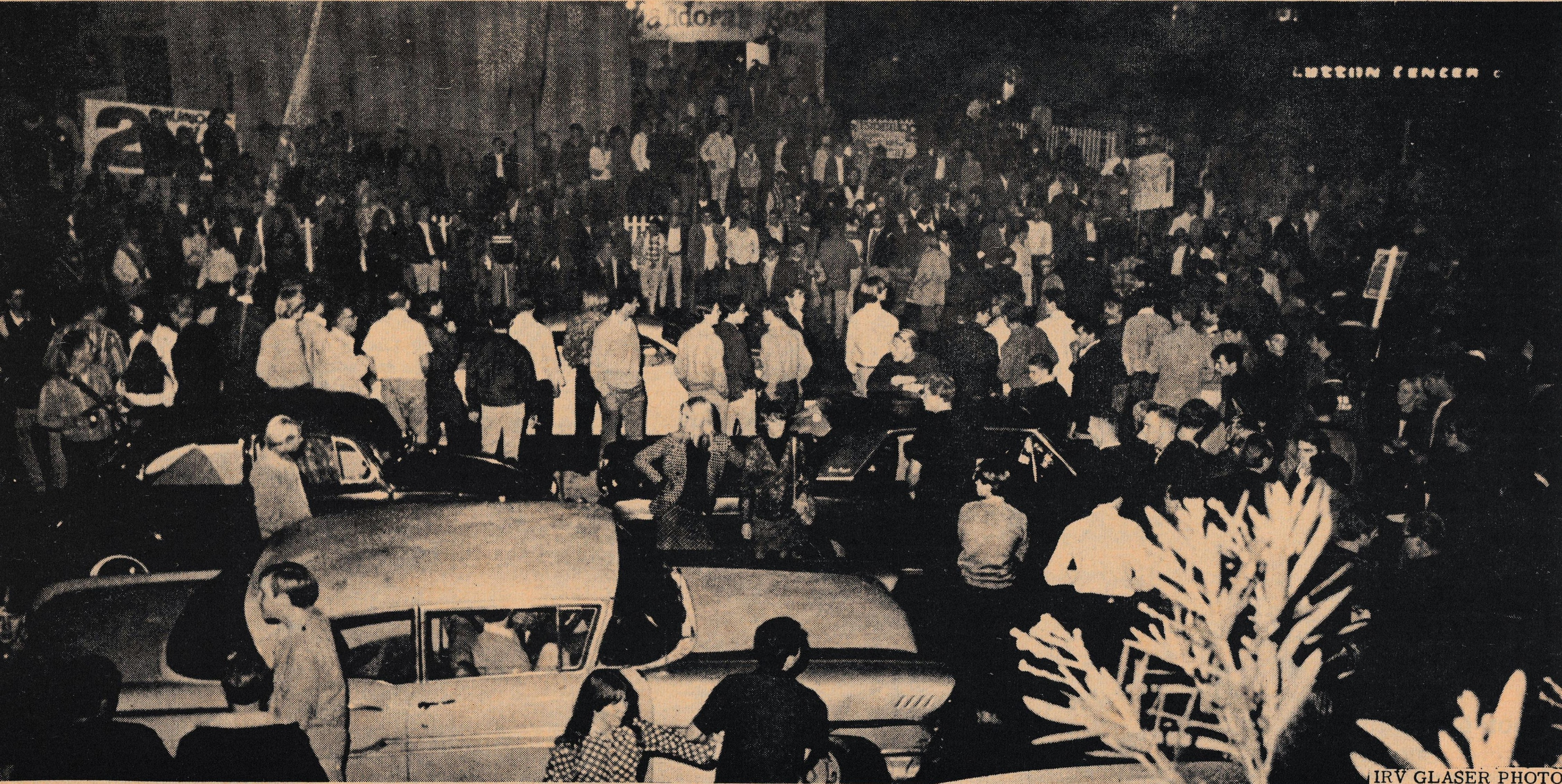
- Demonstrators outside the Pandora's Box nightclub on November 12, 1966; originally published in the Los Angeles Free Press
- Date: November 1966 – January 1967
- Location: West Hollywood, California, United States

Parties
LAPD	Hippies

The Sunset Strip curfew riots, also known as the "hippie riots", were a series of early counterculture-era clashes that took place between police and young people on the Sunset Strip in West Hollywood, California, United States, in 1966.

== History ==
By the mid-1960s, The Sunset Strip had become a place dominated by young members of the hippie and rock and roll counterculture.

At the behest of business owners and residents, in 1966 the Los Angeles City Council imposed nightly curfews intended to curtail the growing "nuisance" of hippie antiwar protests. They targeted the Strip's most prominent rock club, the Whisky a Go Go, forcing its managers to change the club's name to The Whisk . Furthermore, annoyed residents and business owners in the district had encouraged the passage of strict (10 p.m.) curfew and loitering laws to reduce the traffic congestion resulting from crowds of young club patrons. This was perceived by young local rock fans as an infringement on their civil rights, and for weeks tensions and protests swelled.

On November 12, 1966, fliers were distributed along the Strip inviting people to demonstrate later that day. Hours before the protest one of L.A.'s rock 'n' roll radio stations announced there would be a rally at Pandora's Box, a club facing forced closure and demolition at the corner of Sunset Boulevard and Crescent Heights, and cautioned people to tread carefully. That evening, as many as 1,000 youthful demonstrators, including such celebrities as Jack Nicholson and Peter Fonda (who was handcuffed by police), erupted in protest against the perceived repressive enforcement of these recently invoked curfew laws.

The unrest continued the next night and off and on throughout November and December. Meanwhile, the local administration had decided to get tough, and rescinded the "youth permits" of twelve of the Strip's clubs, thereby making them off-limits to anybody under 21. In November 1966, the Los Angeles City Council voted to acquire and demolish the Pandora's Box. The club was eventually demolished in early August 1967.

According to Timeline's Matt Reimann, the riots anticipated a cultural rift that only grew in the coming years. In this light, Bob Gibson, manager of the Byrds and the Mamas and the Papas reflected: "If you had to put your finger on an event that was a barometer of the tide turning, it would probably be the Sunset Strip riots."

== Cultural impact ==
Regarding the importance of the Sunset Strip riots, The Guardian journalist Woody Haut argues that "it was, if nothing else, an early salvo in the "culture wars", a battle which continues to this day (...)." He furthermore argues that the riot's most lasting effect had to do with the music that came out of the event.

The incident provided the basis for the 1967 low-budget teen exploitation film Riot on Sunset Strip, and inspired multiple songs:

- "For What It's Worth" written by Stephen Stills and performed by Buffalo Springfield. The song is often used as an antiwar protest song despite not being originally intended as one. Regarding the events, Stills has said: "Riot is a ridiculous name, it was a funeral for Pandora's Box. But it looked like a revolution."
- "Daily Nightly", written by Michael Nesmith and performed by the Monkees.
- "Riot on Sunset Strip" performed by the Standells, which accompanied the eponymous film.
- "Safe in My Garden" by the Mamas and the Papas.
- Joni Mitchell's song "California" contains the line "I'll even kiss a Sunset pig", meaning a policeman on Sunset Strip.
- The Frank Zappa and the Mothers of Invention song "Plastic People" from the 1967 Album Absolutely Free contains the line, "I hear the sound of marching feet down Sunset Blvd. to Crescent Heights, and there, at Pandora's Box, we are confronted with a vast quantity of plastic people" followed by a verse that says, in part, "Watch the Nazis run your town, then go home and check yourself, you think we're singing 'bout someone else."

== See also ==
- Pandora's Box, the nightclub that was at the center of the riots on the Sunset Strip.
- Whisky a Go Go, the Strip's most prominent rock club.
- Ernest E. Debs, mid-20th century Los Angeles County supervisor who represented the district and fought against the counterculture.
- Counterculture of the 1960s
- List of incidents of civil unrest in the United States
- 1967 Century City demonstration
