= Riot on Sunset Strip =

1967 film by Arthur Dreifuss

- Film poster
- Directed by: Arthur Dreifuss
- Written by: Orville H. Hampton
- Produced by: Sam Katzman
- Starring: Frank Alesia; Aldo Ray; Mimsy Farmer; Michael Evans; Anna Strasberg; Tim Rooney
- Cinematography: Paul C. Vogel
- Edited by: Ben Lewis
- Music by: Fred Karger
- Distributed by: American International Pictures
- Release date: March 1, 1967
- Running time: 87 minutes
- Country: United States
- Language: English
- Box office: $1,200,000 (US/ Canada)

Riot on Sunset Strip is a 1967 counterculture-era exploitation movie, released by American International Pictures. It was filmed and released within four months of the late-1966 Sunset Strip curfew riots.

The film stars Frank Alesia, Aldo Ray, Mimsy Farmer, Michael Evans, Anna Strasberg, Laurie Mock, Gene Kirkwood, Tim Rooney, and features musical appearances by The Standells and The Chocolate Watch Band. Earlier that year, Farmer, Mock and Kirkwood appeared in Hot Rods to Hell, where Farmer portrayed the bad girl and Mock a vulnerable virgin. In this film, they switched characters.

The film attempts to capture the essence of the period around the Sunset Strip riot, and also adds a subplot that revolves around a young girl's troubled relationship with her divorced parents. Her dosage with LSD by a would-be seducer, the subsequent 'acid trip' she experiences, and her later discovery by a police sergeant as the victim of gang rape, are among the movie's peak moments.

The film is now available on DVD through the MGM Limited Edition Collection.

== Production notes ==
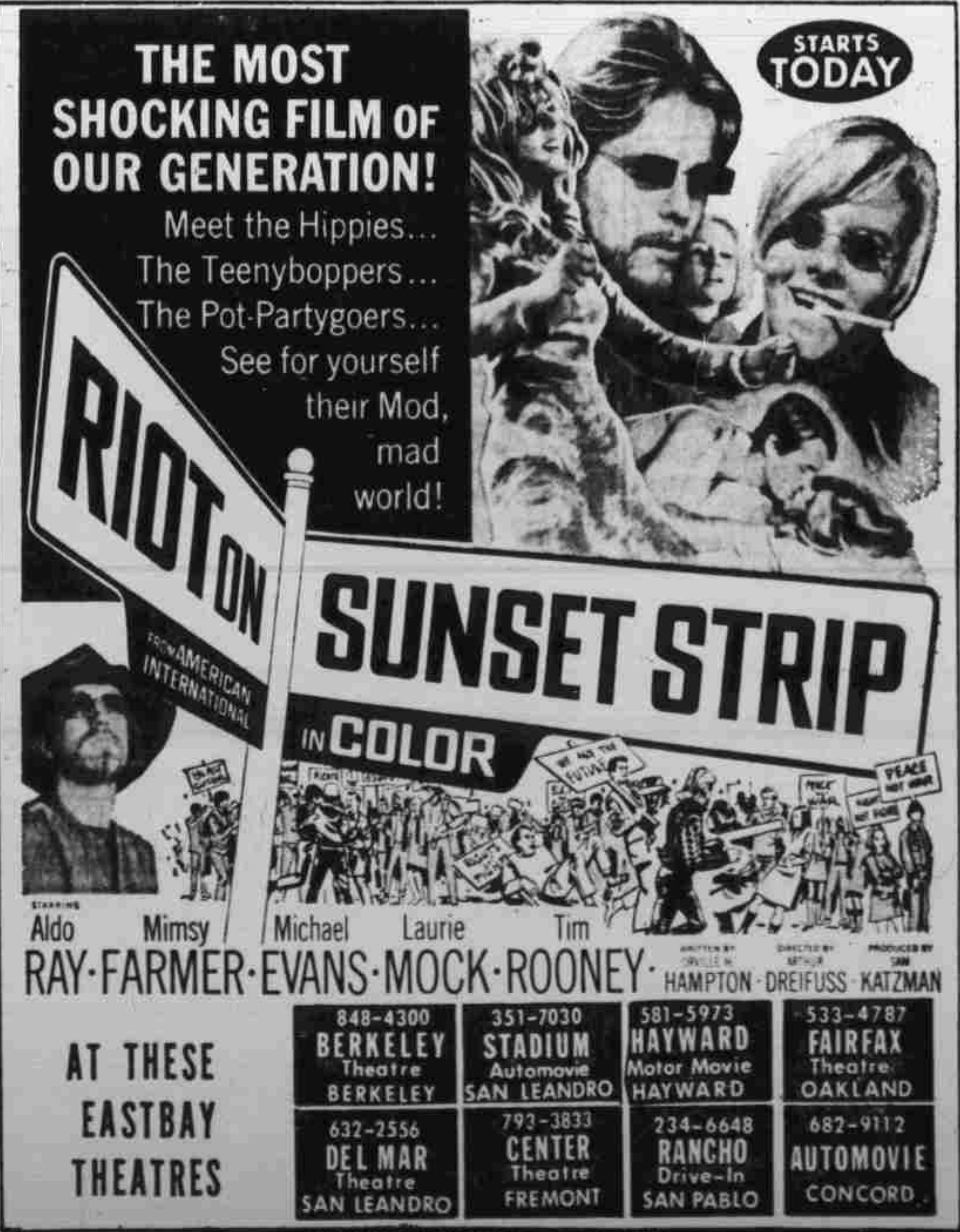
Theatrical advertisement from 1967

"Riot on Sunset Strip", a classic song in the genre of garage punk, was written for the film by Tony Valentino and John Fleck of the Standells.

The film was made for MGM but they could not move fast enough to release it so Katzman sold it to American International Pictures.

== Cast ==
- Aldo Ray as Walt Lorimer
- Mimsy Farmer as Andrea Dollier
- Michael Evans as Frank Tweedy
- Laurie Mock as Liz-Ann Barbrey
- Tim Rooney as Grady Toss
- Bill Baldwin as Stokes
- Anna Strasberg as Helen Tweedy (credited as Anna Mizrahi)
- Hortense Petra as Margie
- Schuyler Hayden as Herbie
- Gene Kirkwood as Flip
- Pat Renella as Perry
- Forrest Lewis as Aynsley
- George E. Carey as Arnow
- John Hart as Pritchard
- Dick Winslow as Curtis

== See also ==
- List of American films of 1967
- Hippie exploitation films
- Captivity narratives
- Rape and revenge films
