= Negre =

Negre or Nègre is a surname. Notable people with the surname include:

- Ademar lo Negre (fl. 1210-1219), troubadour from Languedoc
- Jacques-Étienne Marconis de Nègre (1795-1868), French writer and active freemason.
- Charles Nègre (1820–1880), French photographer
- José Negre (1875-1939), Spanish anarcho-syndicalist leader
- Ed Negre (1929-2014), American NASCAR driver
- Ernest Nègre (1907-2000), French toponymist
- Raymond Nègre (1908 -1985), French production designer and artistic designor
- Léopold Nègre (1879-1961), French biologist and physician
- Louis Nègre (born 1947), French politician and member of the Senate of France
- Meritxell Negre (born 1971-2020), Spanish singer-songwriter who was the sixth "Peaches" of international R&B/pop duo Peaches and Herb
- David Nègre (born 1973), French football player
- Dubravka Đedović, formerly Nègre (born 1978), is a Serbian banker and politician serving as minister of mining and energy since 2022. She was married to Christophe Nègre, a former triathlete and rugby player, until 2020.
