= Ecology Flag =

American cultural symbol

The Ecology Flag (Theta version).

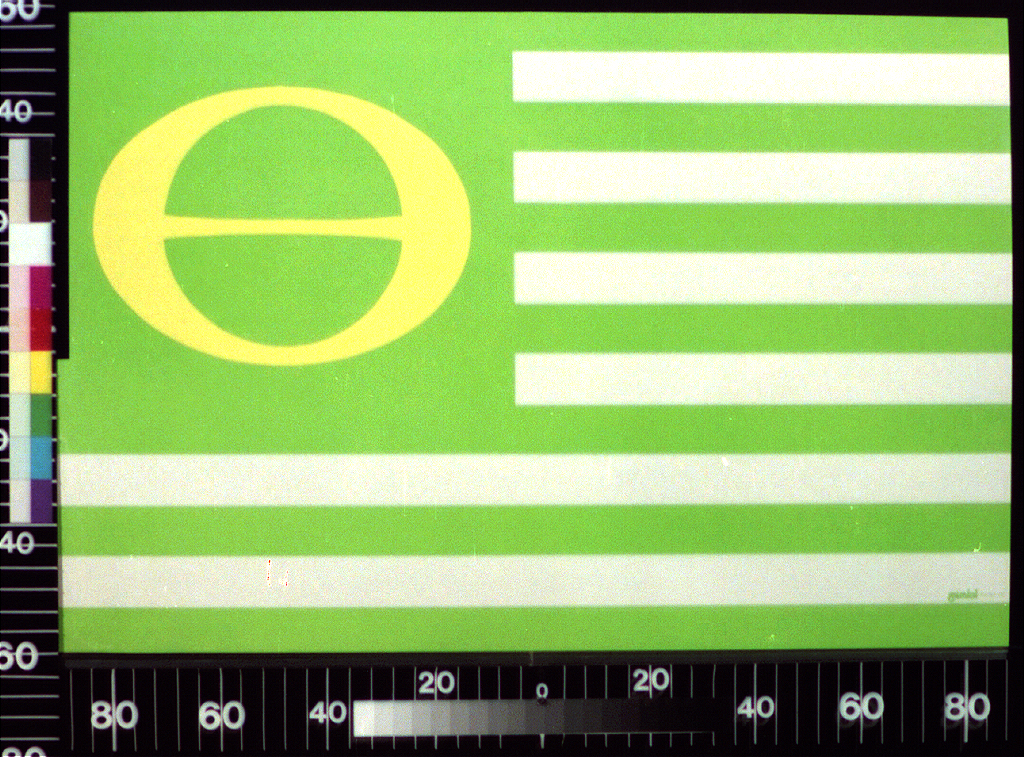
Ecology Flag poster from the Yanker Poster Collection

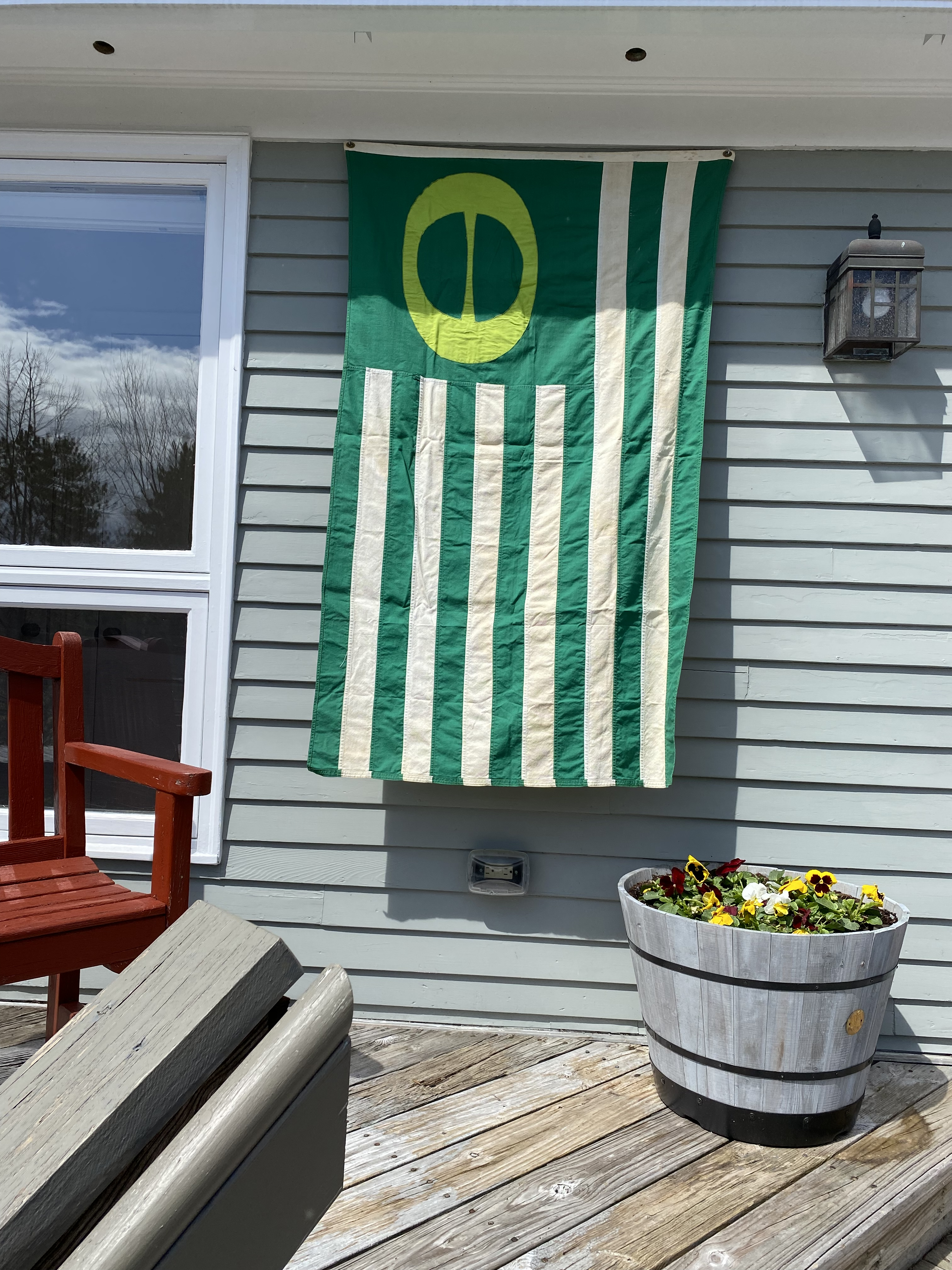
The First Ecology Flag. Credit, Kathleen K. Shepherd

The Ecology Flag is a cultural symbol used primarily in the 1970s by American environmentalists. It is a symbol of people's commitment to clean up the environment.

== Description ==
Ron Cobb created an ecology symbol which he published on October 25, 1969 in the Los Angeles Free Press and then placed in the public domain. The symbol was formed by taking the letters "e" and "o", taken from the words environment and organism, and putting them in superposition, thereby forming a shape reminiscent of the Greek letter Θ (Theta).

Jack Shepherd, then Senior Editor at Look magazine, incorporated Cobb's symbol into an image of a flag for Look's April 21, 1970 issue. This widely popularized the theta symbol, which is associated with the Greek word thanatos 'death', pointing to human threats to the environment and atmosphere of the earth. Shepherd patterned the flag after the flag of the United States, with thirteen stripes alternating green and white, the green standing for unspoiled land and the white for clean air. Its canton was green with the ecology symbol where the stars would be in the United States flag.

== History ==
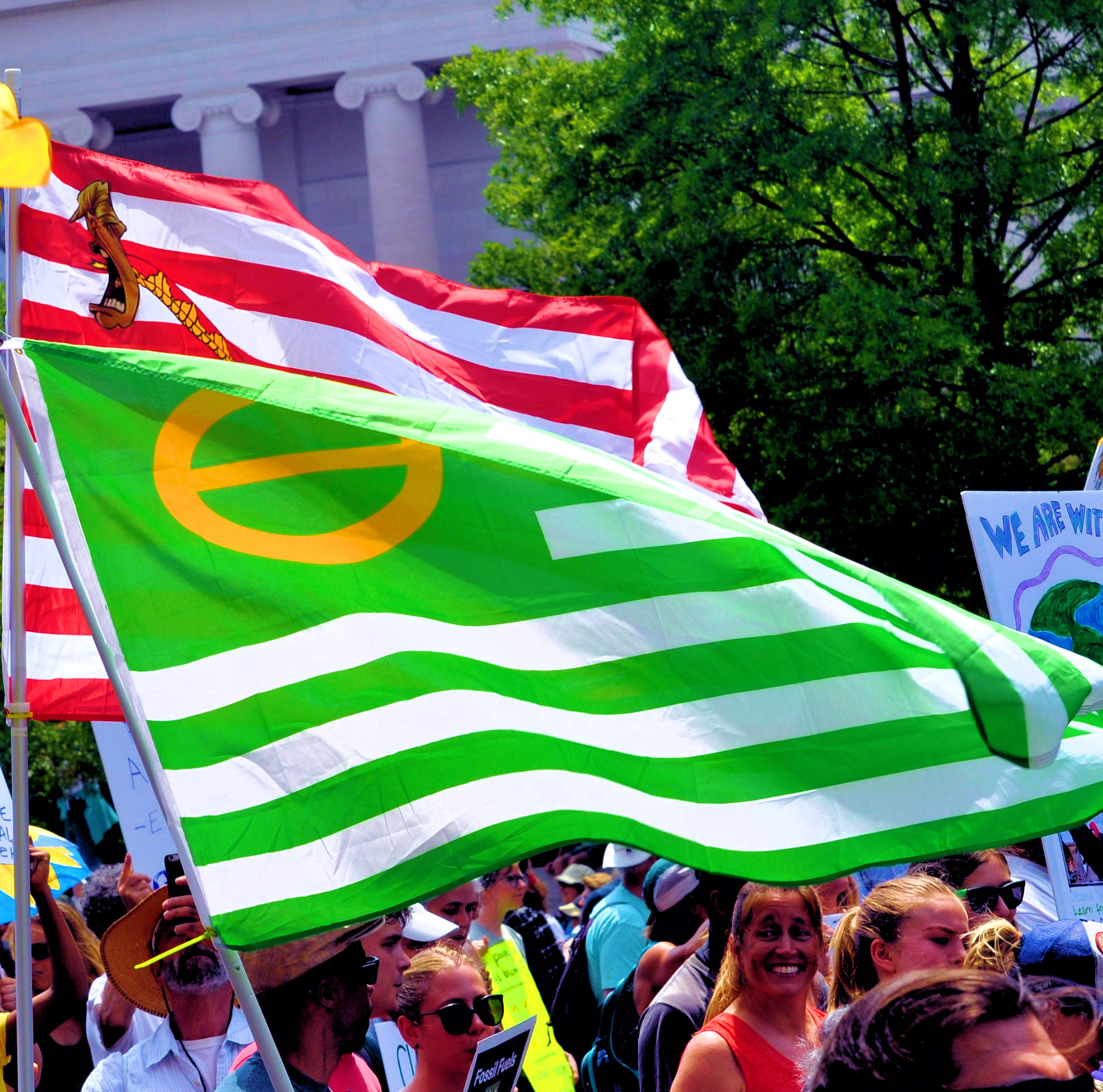
Ecology Flag in a 2017 Climate March

The Ecology Flag was designed in 1970 by Jack Shepherd, then senior editor at Look magazine, to promote the first Earth Day. Shepherd and colleagues Christopher Wren, and David Maxie, hung the first Ecology Flag from the fifth-floor window of the Look Building on Madison Avenue at 51st, next door to St Patrick's Cathedral. It went to Washington, D.C. the next day for the first Earth Day March.

Ecology flags showed up many places in the 1970s. One of the earliest recorded flyings of an actual Ecology Flag was in 1970. As a 16-year-old high school student, Betsy Boze, an environmental advocate and social activist, made a 3-by-5-foot (0.91 m × 1.52 m) green and white "theta" ecology flag to commemorate the first Earth Day (then called Ecology Day). Initially denied permission to fly the flag at C. E. Byrd High School in Shreveport, Louisiana, Vogel sought and received authorization from the Louisiana Legislature and Louisiana Governor John McKeithen in time to display the flag for Earth Day.

As part of an Earth Week celebration in 1970, students at Aiken High School in Aiken, South Carolina, received permission to replace the South Carolina state flag on the flagpole outside the school with a home-made Ecology Flag. The Ecology Flag flew for a week beneath the American flag, as documented in the Aiken Standard newspaper of April 21, 1970.

Students at Harper College in Palatine, Illinois, made an agreement with the administration to fly a homemade Ecology Flag under the U.S. flag for the 1971–1972 school year. The flag flew over the Naval Civil Engineering Laboratory in Port Hueneme, California, in 1973 and decorated a building as a mural in Mississippi Palisades State Park in Illinois in 1976.

The flag continues to be used as a symbol of concern for the planet, showing up at the People's Climate March in 2017.

== In popular culture ==
It can be seen hung on the classroom wall in the 11th episode of the first season of Police Woman, "Smack", and in the 13th and 14th episodes of the fourth season of King of the Hill.

== See also ==
- Esperanto jubilee symbol
- Earth Flag
