= Anne Draper =

American trade unionist and activist (1917-1973)

Anne Kracik Draper (March 4, 1917 - March 25, 1973) was an American trade unionist and activist. Born in 1917 to Polish immigrants in New York City, she graduated from Hunter College. She and her husband, Hal Draper, were leading figures in the International Socialists, a Trotskyist group. She was the West Coast Union Labor Director for the Amalgamated Clothing Workers of America (ACWA). She was an active supporter of Cesar Chavez and the United Farm Workers as well as the founder of the Labor Assembly for Peace and Union W.A.G.E. (Women's Alliance to Gain Equity). Her papers are held at Stanford University and at the California Historical Society's North Baker Research Library.
