= Jerry Farber =

American educator and writer

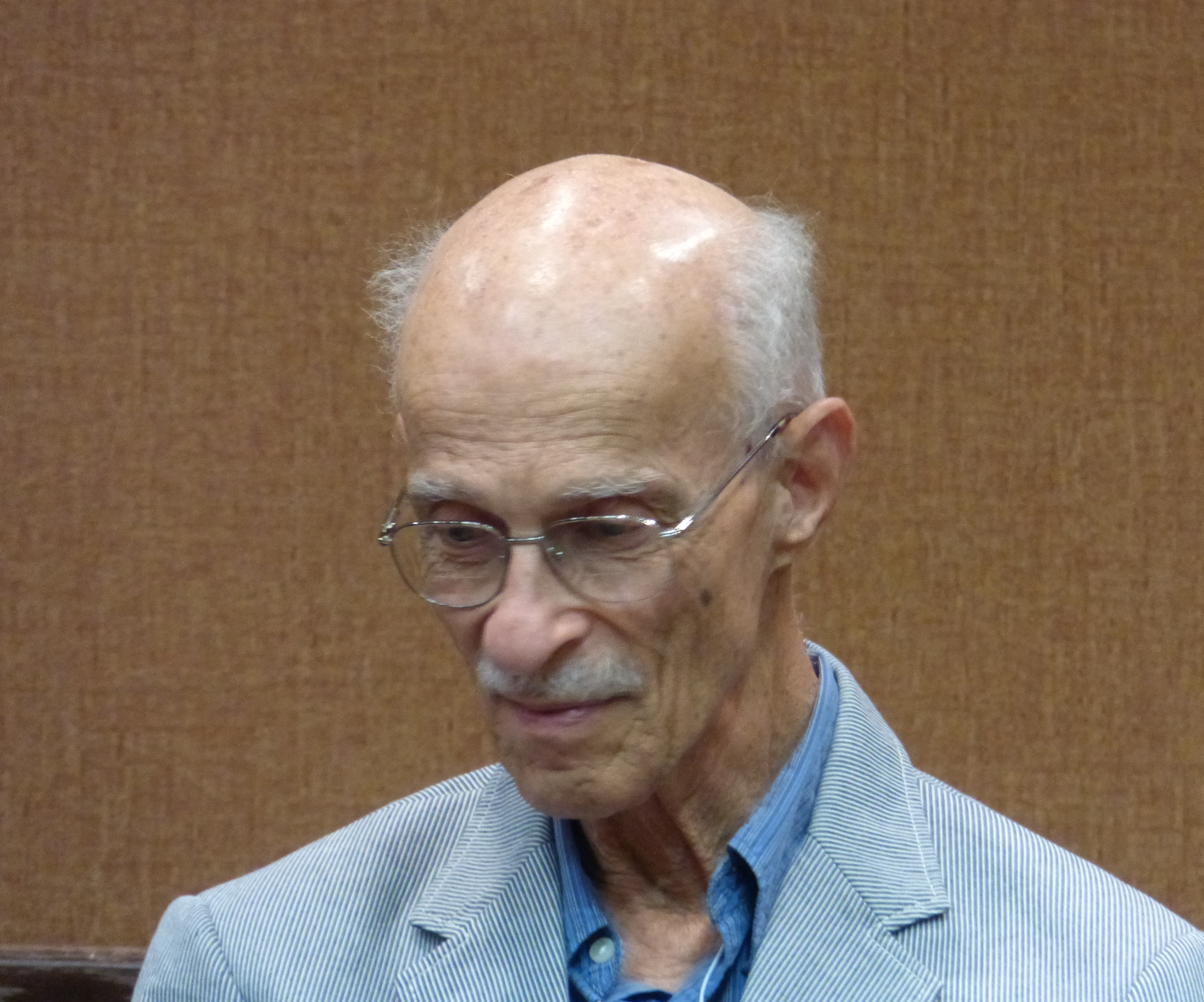
Farber in 2013

Gerald H. 'Jerry' Farber (born 1935) is an American educator, writer, activist, and former child actor.

== Early life and education ==
Farber was born in El Paso, Texas, in 1935. As an undergraduate student at UCLA in December 1954, he was nominated by the senior staff of the UCLA Daily Bruin to be city editor of the student newspaper, but the other four staff nominees for editorial positions and he were rejected by a special two-man committee composed of student body president Skip Byrne and a representative of the university administration. In the spring term 1955, four other students (Fredy Perlman, Martin McReynolds, Barry Tunick and Steve Wayne) and he issued and distributed an underground newspaper called The Observer on the UCLA campus. Farber subsequently went on to earn a PhD in comparative literature from Occidental College in 1970. His dissertation was titled: "The Aesthetic Role of the Present in À la Recherche du temps perdu."

== Career ==
As a child, Farber was a radio actor and also appeared as Fleance in Orson Welles's film version of Macbeth. A member of the 500 Club, made up of child actors who had each appeared in over 500 radio shows, Farber initiated the role of Stevie Kent, president of the Beverly Hills Beavers, on The Jack Benny Program. Among the other radio shows on which he appeared were The Great Gildersleeve, Lux Radio Theatre, The Screen Guild Theatre, The Mercury Theatre on the Air, and Suspense. In addition, he performed in a number of radio adaptations of literary works—appearing as David Copperfield on Favorite Story, as Huckleberry Finn on NBC University Theater, and as Oliver Twist, together with Basil Rathbone as Fagin, on Stars Over Hollywood. He played Twist again, with Rathbone, on a Columbia Records album.

After several years in the English Department at L.A. State College (now California State University, Los Angeles), Farber became a professor of English and comparative literature at San Diego State University. Farber taught subsequently for seven years in the English Department at the University of San Diego. He is widely known as the author of a 1967 antiestablishment essay, "The Student as Nigger", in which he likened the student-professor relationship in American universities to that of slave and master. This piece, based on his experience as a teacher and as an often-arrested activist in the civil-rights movement, served as the title essay of his first book.

His other books include The University of Tomorrowland and A Field Guide to the Aesthetic Experience. Since then, he has published essays that include "The Third Circle: On Education and Distance Learning", "What Is Literature? What Is Art? Integrating Essence and History", "Toward a Theoretical Framework for the Study of Humor in Literature and the Other Arts", "Teaching and Presence", and "On Not Betraying Poetry." Farber's short story "Gorman", which appeared in his first book, was included in The Year’s Best Science Fiction No. 4, edited by Brian Aldiss and Harry Harrison.

== Civil-rights movement participation ==
In the civil-rights movement, Farber was a member of the Non-Violent Action Committee (N-VAC), which was formed as a more militant alternative to the Congress of Racial Equality, and which was active in fighting job discrimination in Los Angeles. He was arrested seven times during this period, serving a number of jail sentences, and was arrested on one further occasion for participating in an anti-Vietnam War demonstration against The Dow Chemical Co., which supplied napalm to the U.S. military. He was present as an observer for N-VAC throughout the Watts Rebellion (often referred to as the Watts Riots) in 1965. His account of this event was first published in the L.A. Free Press and has since been reprinted in Reporting Civil Rights, published by the Library of America.

== Filmography ==
Year	Title	Role	Notes
1947	Buck Privates Come Home	Boy	Uncredited
1948	Macbeth	Fleance	
