= Preservation Iowa =

Non-profit organization advocating historic preservation in Iowa

Preservation Iowa, formerly called the Iowa Historic Preservation Alliance (IHPA), was founded in 1989 by members of the public concerned about the destruction of significant historic sites and buildings in the state of Iowa.

Preservation Iowa sponsors two programs, Iowa's Most Endangered Properties and Preservation at its Best Awards. Currently, it is undertaking initiatives to document barns, country schools, and small-town movie theaters. Preservation Iowa and the National Trust for Historic Preservation are combining efforts to document and mitigate the effects of the 2008 Iowa floods on historic structures.

Preservation Iowa publishes the Iowa Preservationist quarterly.

The 2008 Preservation Iowa "Iowa's Most Endangered Properties" include:

- Gruwell and Crew General Store, West Branch (on the NRHP)
- Len Jus Building (Mason City, Iowa), Mason City
- Masonic Building (Burrows Block--Bank Block), Osceola
- Union Block, Mount Pleasant (on the NRHP)
- Fort Madison Archaeological Site, Fort Madison (on the NRHP)
- Faeth Farmstead and Orchard District, Fort Madison (on the NRHP)
- Grant Wood Home, 318 14th Street NE, Cedar Rapids
- Bethel African Methodist Church, Cedar Rapids
- Flooded Historic Neighborhoods, Cedar Rapids

== Endangered historic Iowa gallery ==
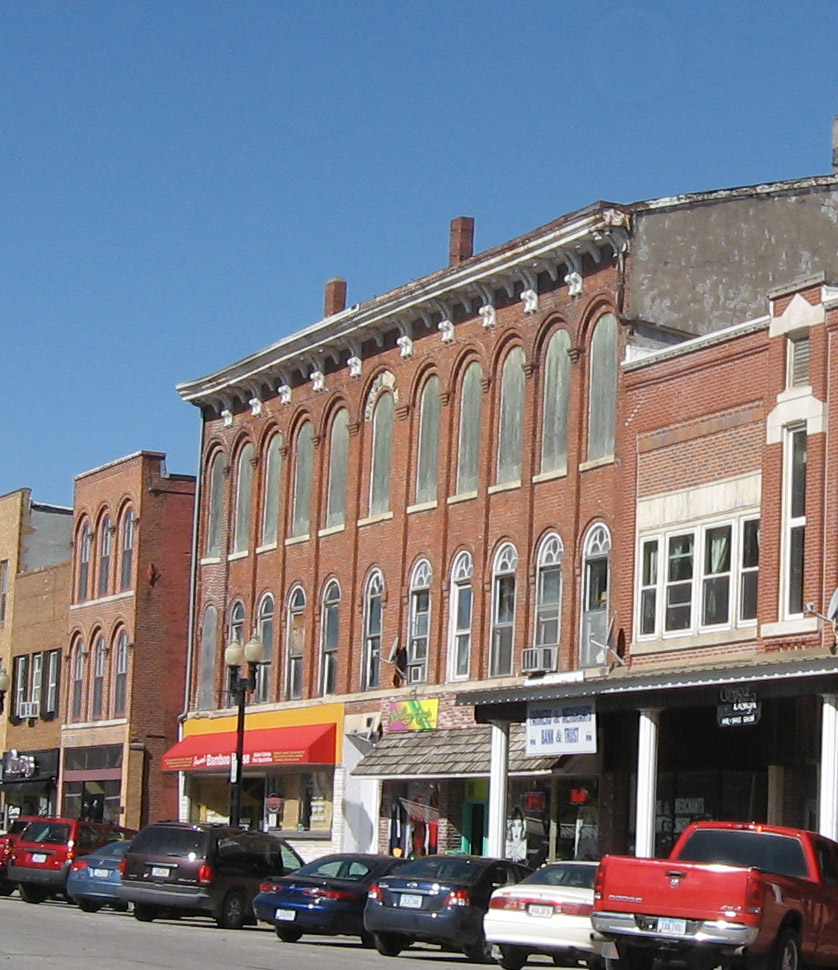
Union Block (Mount Pleasant, Iowa)

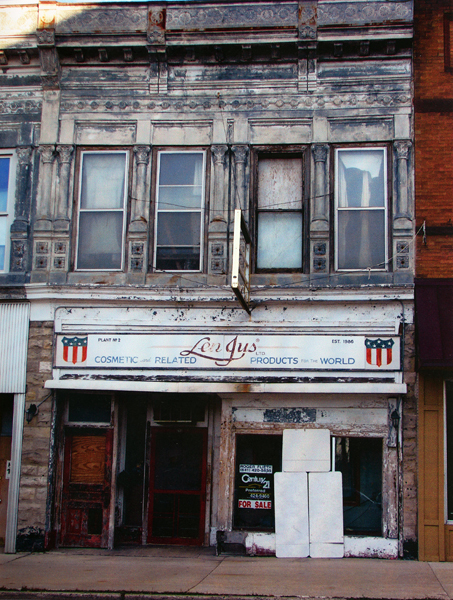
Len Jus Building (Mason City, Iowa)

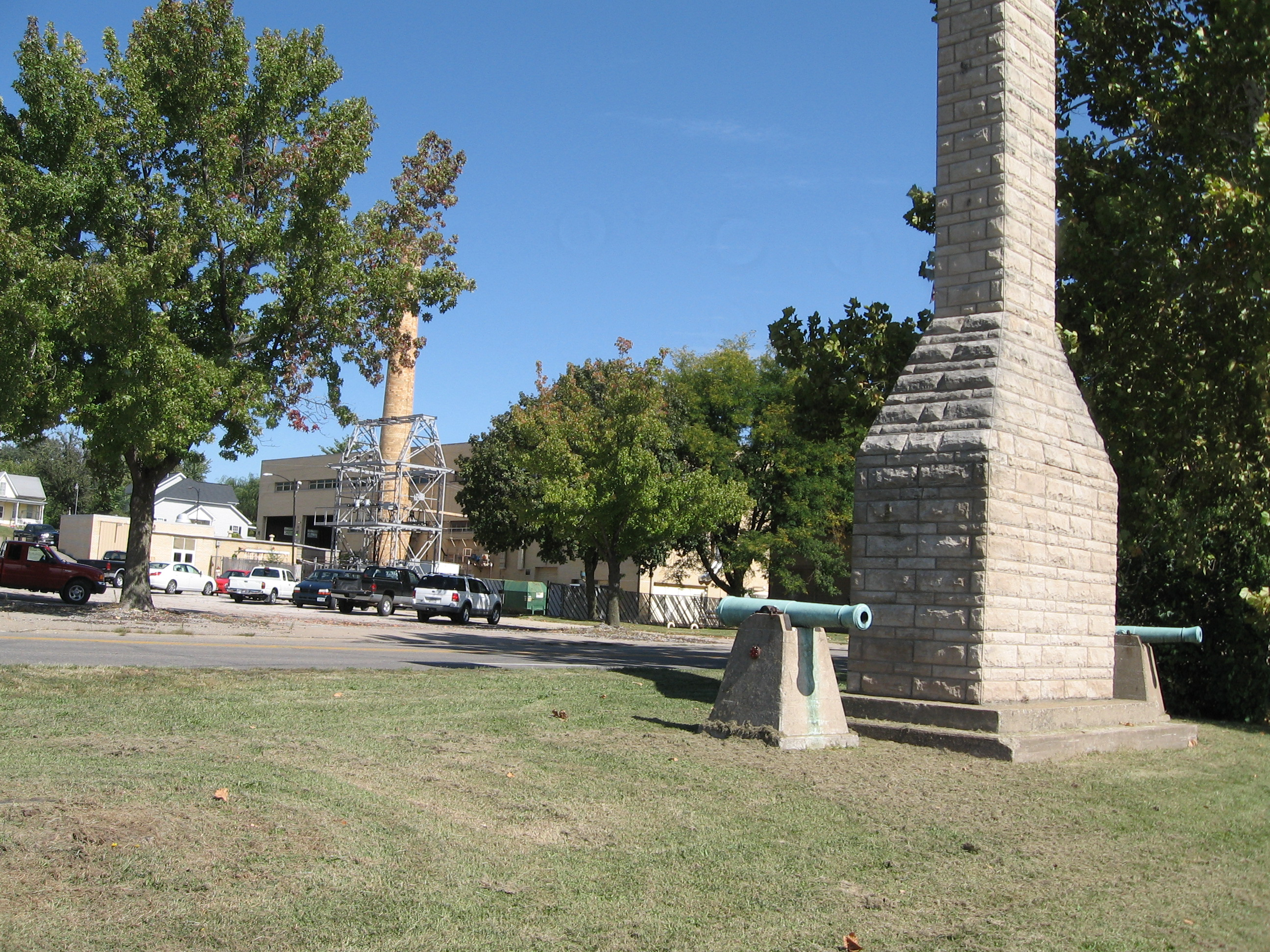
Fort Madison Archaeological Site

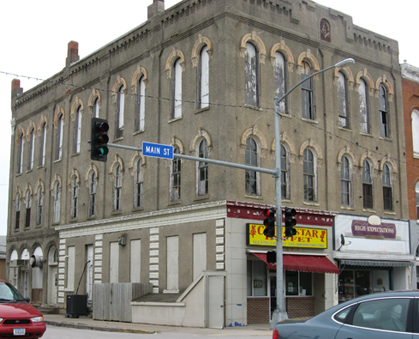
Masonic Building (Osceola, Iowa)

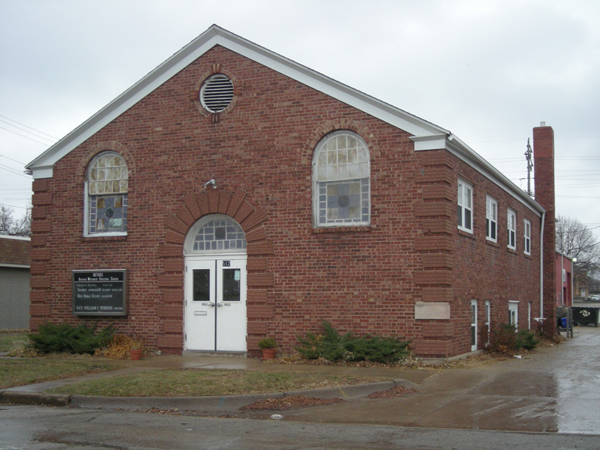
Bethel African Methodist Church (Cedar Rapids, Iowa)

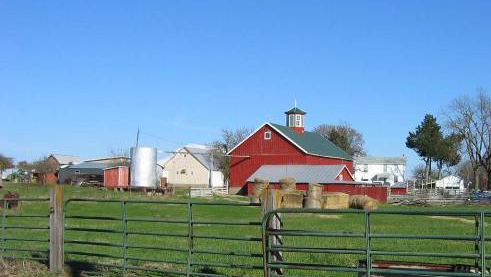
Faeth Farmstead and Orchard District

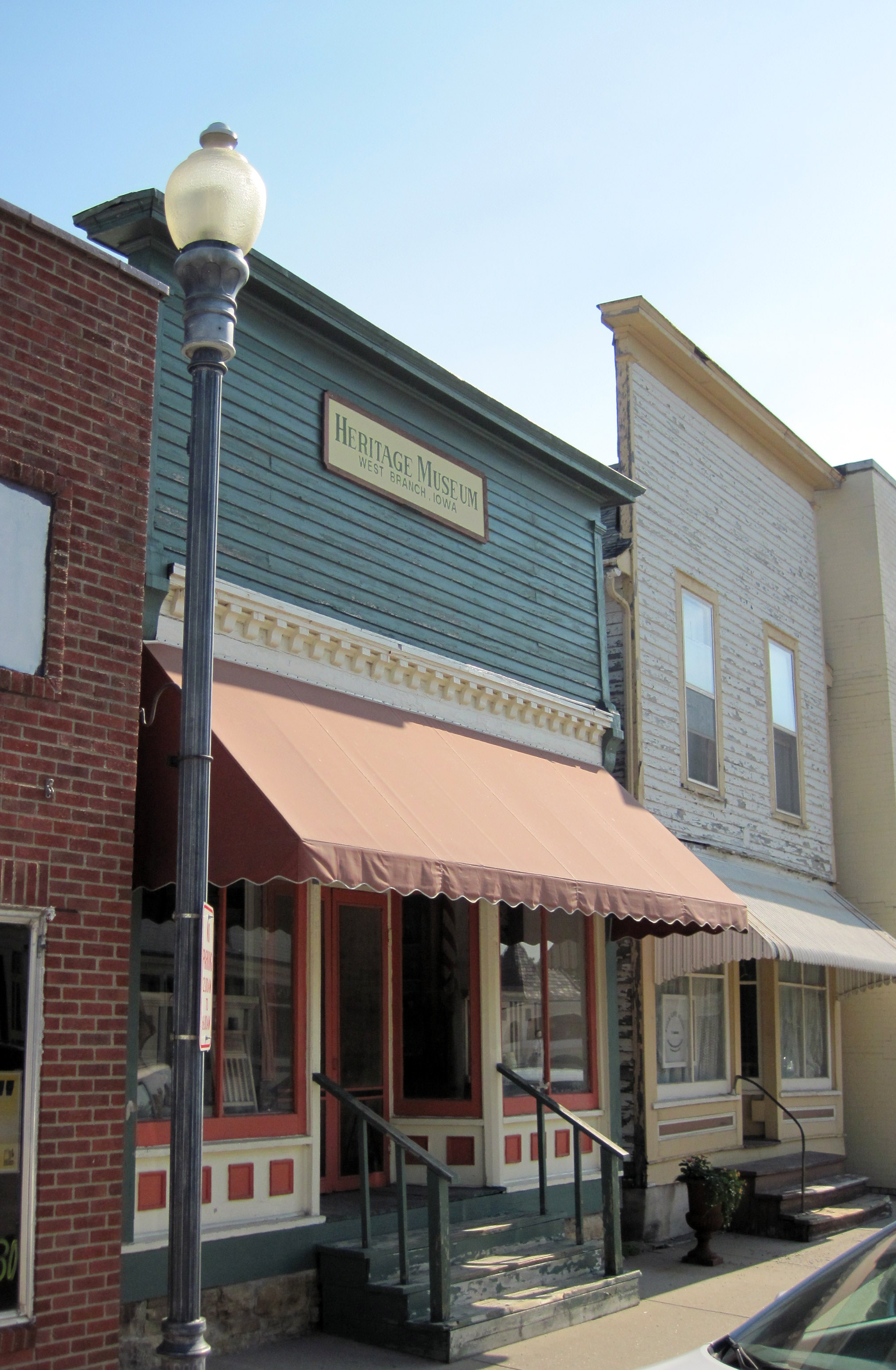
Gruwell and Crew General Store

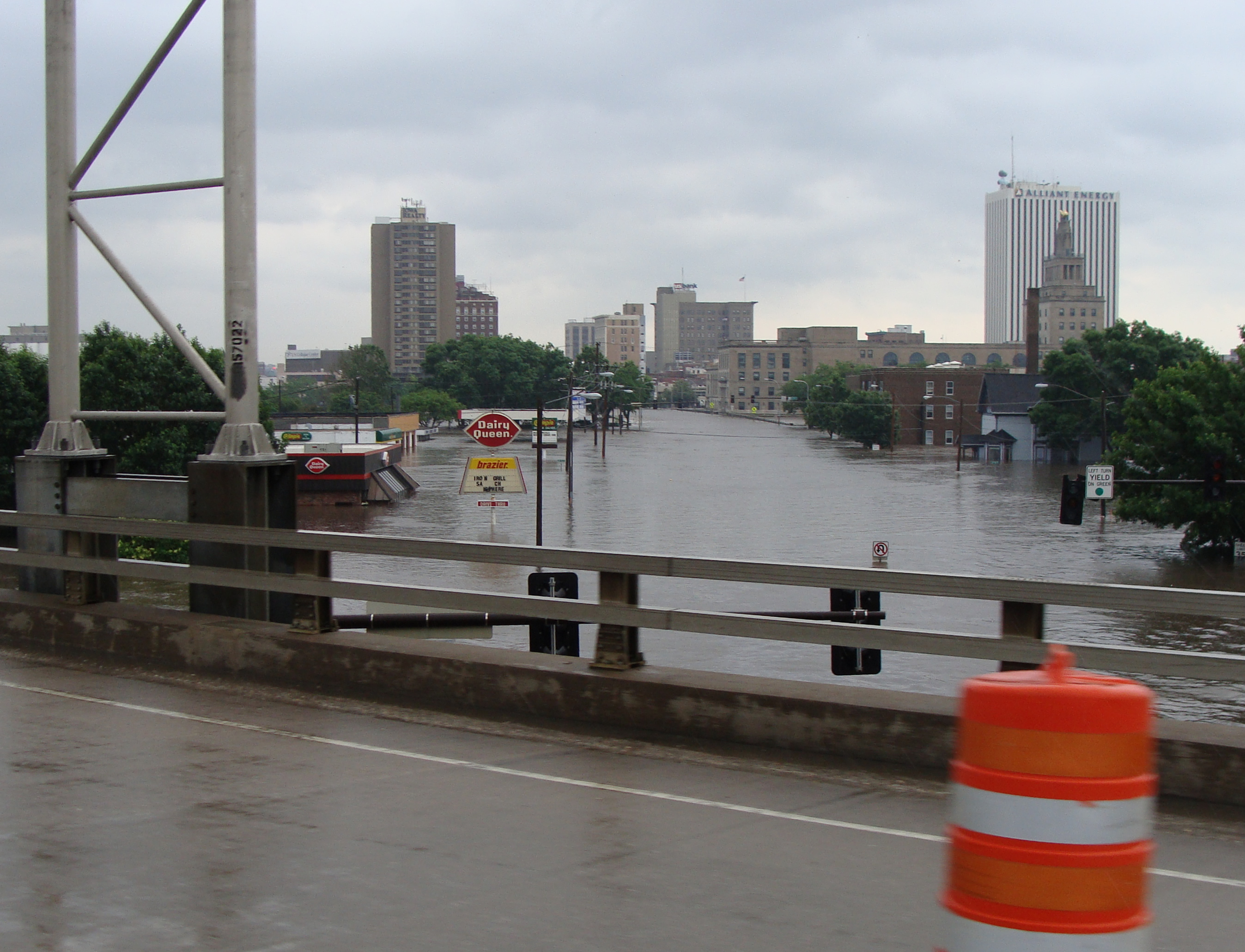
Flooded Cedar Rapids

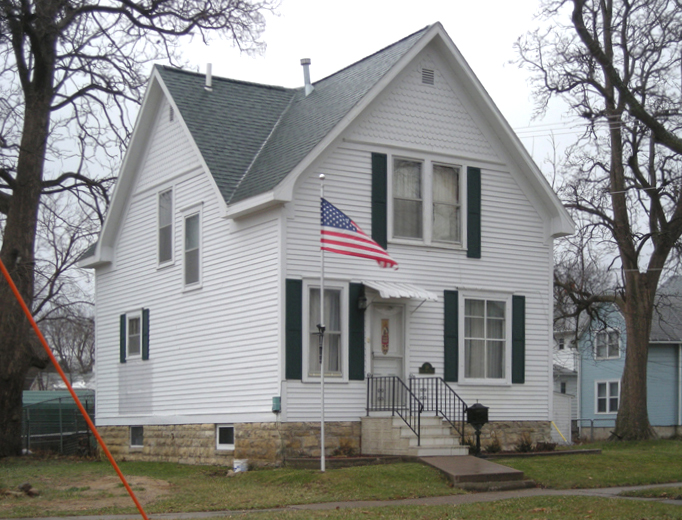
Grant Wood home
