= IHPA =

IHPA may refer to the:

- Illinois Historic Preservation Agency
- Iowa Historic Preservation Alliance
