= West Branch Commercial Historic District =

Historic district in Iowa, United States

- U.S. National Register of Historic Places
- U.S. Historic district
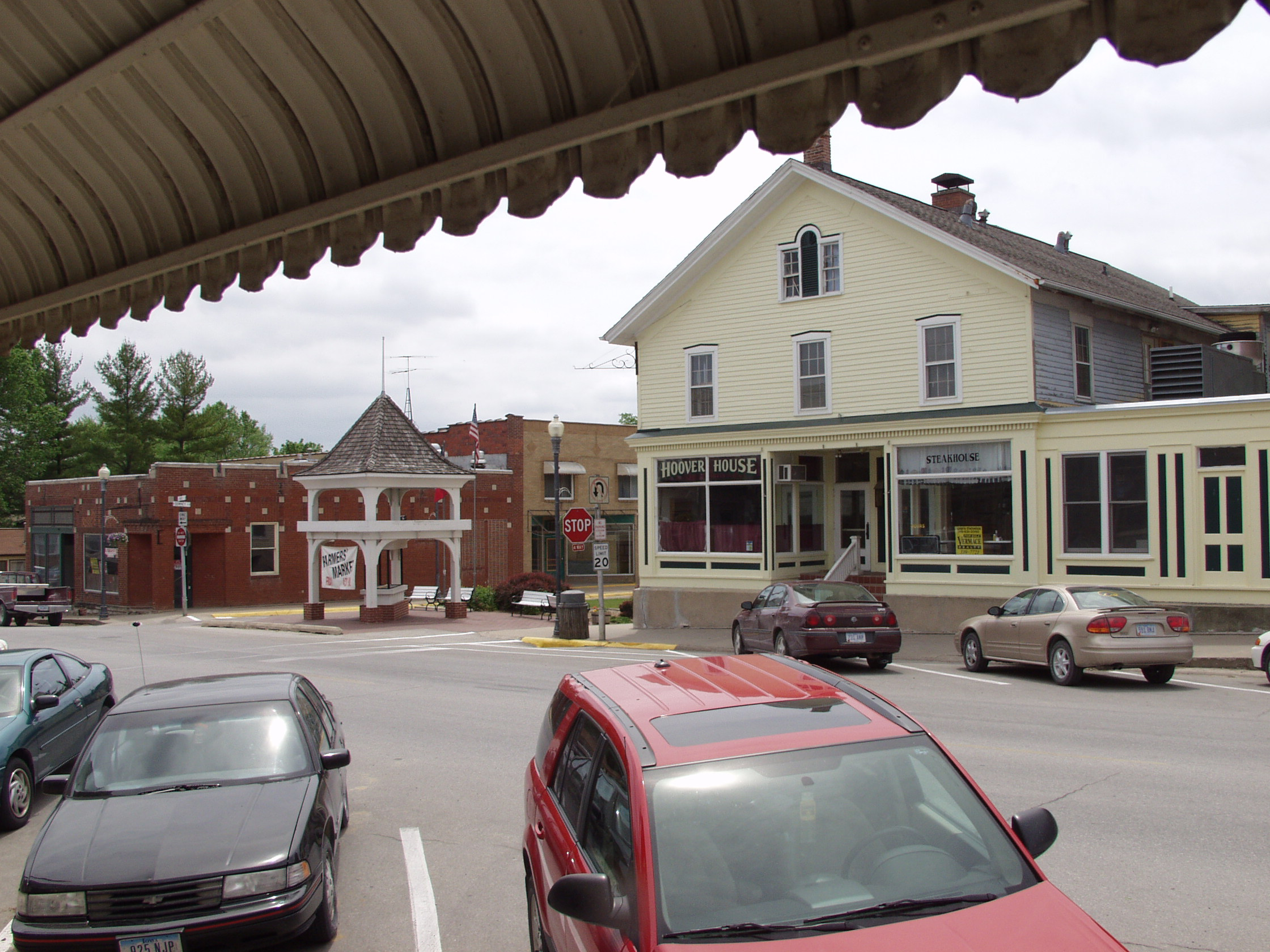
- The gazebo and Hoover House in downtown West Branch in June 2005

- Location within Iowa Location within the United States
- Location: N. Downey and E. and W. Main Sts., West Branch, Iowa
- Coordinates: 41°40′17″N 91°20′48″W
- Area: 1 acre (0.40 ha)
- Architect: Multiple
- Architectural style: Prairie School, Commercial Style
- NRHP reference No.: 87000028 (original); 90000158 (increase 1); 95000386 (increase 2)

Significant dates
- Added to NRHP: April 7, 1987
- Boundary increases: February 23, 1990; April 7, 1995

The downtown district of West Branch, Iowa is part of the West Branch Commercial Historic District. Multiple architectural styles are represented. The historic and endangered Gruwell and Crew General Store is also part of the district.

== History ==
The West Branch Commercial Historic District recognizes sixteen buildings that reflect the evolution of West Branch, Iowa into an important commercial center. This change largely occurred around 1900, when wooden storefronts were demolished in favor of ornate commercial blocks.

The oldest building in the district, the Grinnell Building at 112 West Main Street, may date back to 1869. Shortly after it was built, Nate Crook opened a restaurant and barber shop in a building at 102 W. Main. He later expanded the building to become a hotel and livery. The West Branch Bank opened at 104 W. Main in 1875, though it moved across the street three years later. The next period of growth was the 1890s. The Union Block, Citizens' Savings Bank, Gruwell and Crew General Store, Patterson-Leech Building, and Rich and Bailey Block were built during this decade. The 1890s also saw the construction of the ornate Opera Block, commissioned by Charles A. Macomber. Three stores shared the first story, while the second story was used by the Freemasons and had a 500-seat theater.

On April 7, 1987, the district was recognized by the National Park Service with a listing on the National Register of Historic Places. The Gruwell and Crew General Store had previously been recognized individually on September 9, 1982. Additional buildings were added to the district on February 23, 1990 and April 7, 1995. The 1907 Winery Building, which served as West Branch's post office and later a full-service gas station, collapsed on June 11, 2010.

== Contributing properties ==
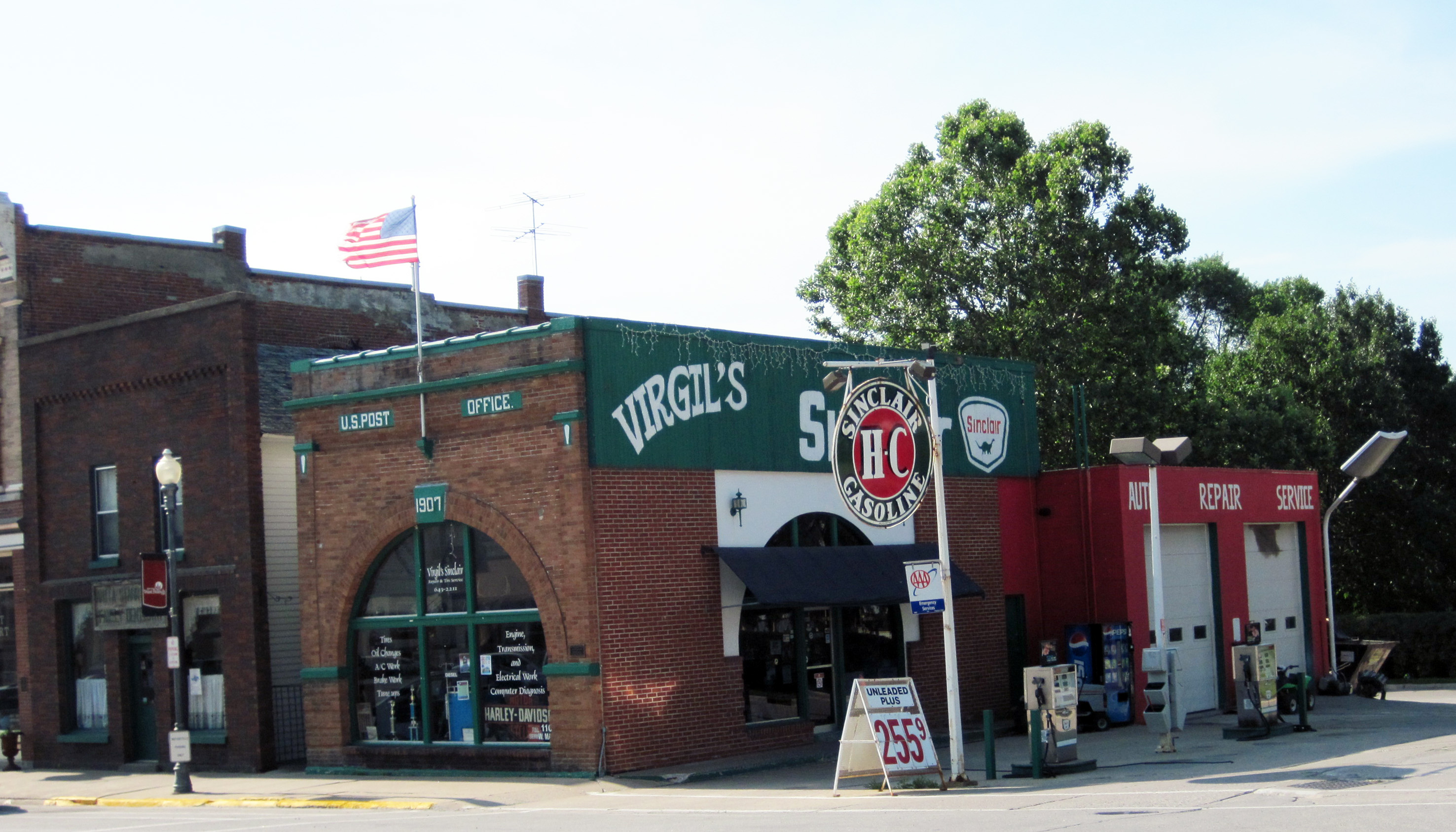
The 1907 Winery/Post Office in June 2009, collapsed June 2010.

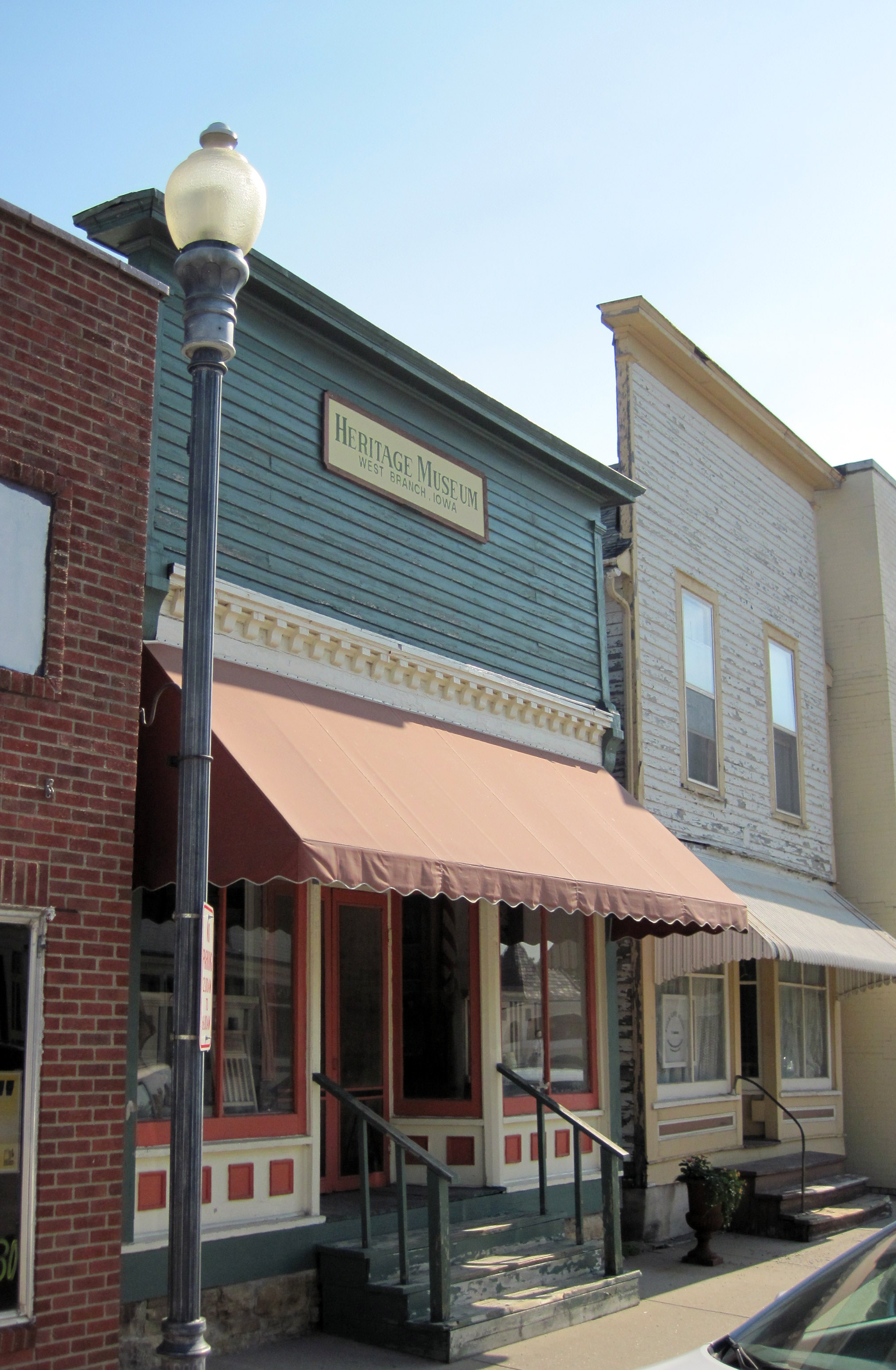
The Gruwell and Crew General Store.

== See also ==
- Herbert Hoover Presidential Library and Museum
- Herbert Hoover National Historic Site, adjacent to the district
