= Scattergood Friends School =

Private secondary school in Cedar County, Iowa, United States

Location
- 1951 Delta Ave. West Branch, Iowa 52358; United States
- Coordinates: 41.664°N 91.309°W

Information
- Type: Private Boarding
- Motto: Scattergood Wherever You Go
- Religious affiliation: Quaker
- Established: 1890
- Head of School: John Zimmerman
- Faculty: 25
- Grades: 6-12
- Colors: Blue and White
- Athletics: Soccer, Basketball, Fencing, Ultimate Frisbee
- Mascot: Crew
- Website: scattergood.org

Scattergood Friends School in Cedar County, Iowa, is a rural, private high school educating students in grades nine through twelve. Since 2020, it also serves as a middle school, educating students in grades six through eight. The school is located in Cedar County, Iowa, two miles (3 km) east and one half mile (800 m) south of the town of West Branch. It is owned and operated by Iowa Yearly Meeting of Friends (Conservative), and accredited by the Iowa Department of Education and by the Independent Schools Association of the Central States (ISACS).

== History ==
Scattergood School was founded in 1890 by Iowa Wilburite Quakers to provide a "guarded education" for their children.

=== Scattergood Hostel ===
The school closed in 1931 due to the financial effects of the Great Depression. In 1939, alarmed at the increasing anti-Semitism and political suppression by the Nazi Party of Germany at the time of Kristallnacht, Quakers of Iowa proposed to receive refugees from Germany and house them at the Scattergood School. From 1939 through 1943, they operated what they called the 'Scattergood Hostel,' accepting a total of 185 refugees and helping them to resettle in the United States. Refugees and volunteers worked communally together to operate the facility, including its farm, and staff provided health care, language classes, and job training. After 1943 refugees were unable to leave Germany.

The Scattergood Hostel was explored in an exhibit at Traces Museum, which operated in St. Paul, Minnesota from 2005 through 2008, as well as a traveling exhibit which toured the Midwest. When the museum closed, the United States Holocaust Museum of Washington, DC took on the permanent exhibit materials. In 2007, Iowa Public TV produced an episode on the Scattergood Hostel for its Living in Iowa series, titled "Out of Hitler's Reach" and based on the book of the same name by Michael Luick-Thrams, founder and director of the Traces Museum.

=== Post-war ===
After the end of the war, the school was reopened for educational operations. Since the late 20th century, about one third of students and staff have been Quakers, with the rest coming from different faith backgrounds. Roughly a quarter of Scattergood students come from outside the United States. Former Bolivian president Gonzalo Sánchez de Lozada, is a Scattergood graduate.

== See also ==
- List of high schools in Iowa
