= Gruwell and Crew General Store =

- U.S. National Register of Historic Places
- U.S. Historic district – Contributing property
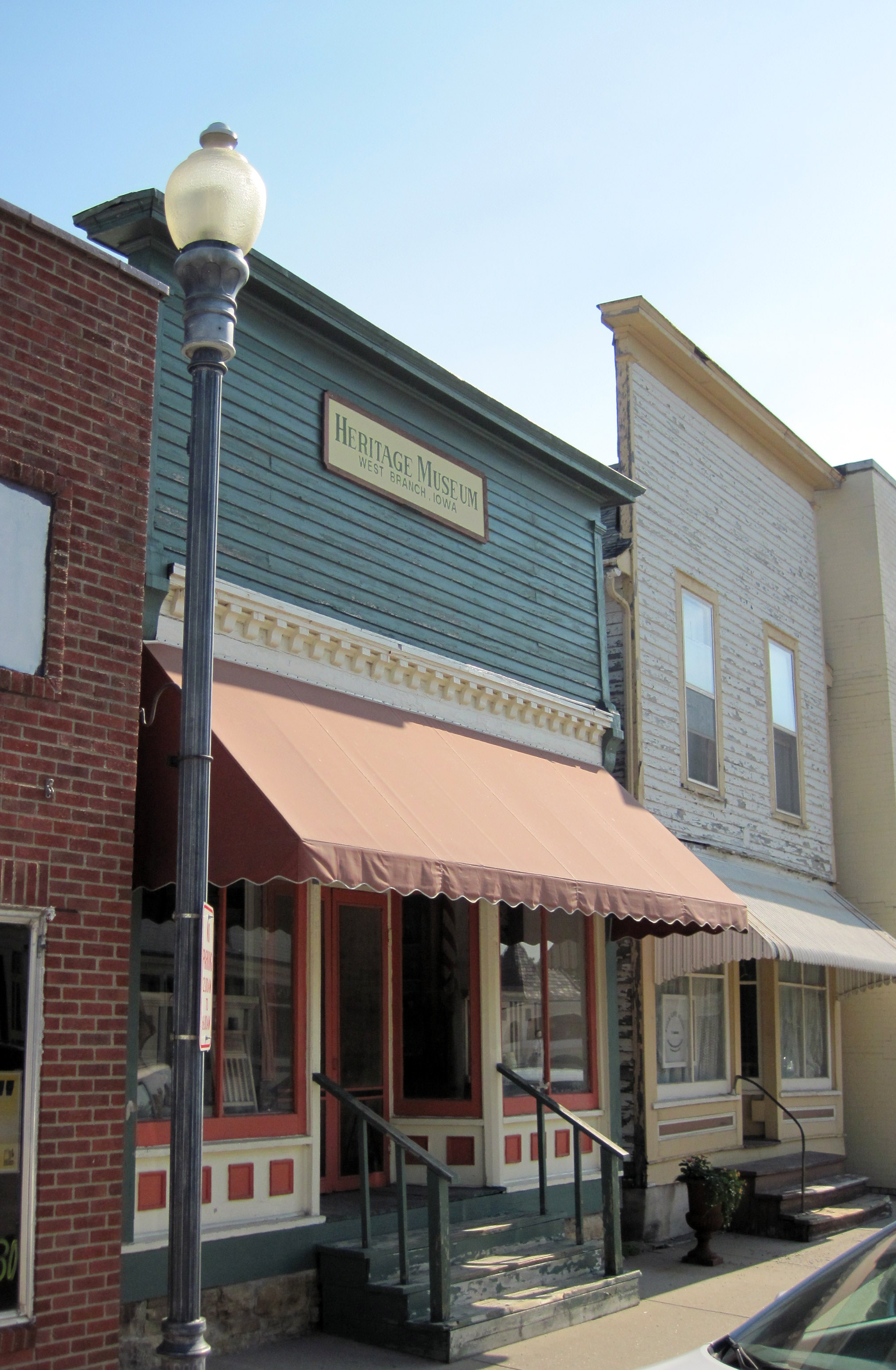
- Gruwell and Crew General Store (Iowa Historic Preservation Alliance)

- Location within Iowa Location within the United States
- Location: 109 W. Main St., West Branch, Iowa
- Coordinates: 41°40′5″N 91°20′49″W
- Built: 1894
- Part of: West Branch Commercial Historic District (ID87000028)
- NRHP reference No.: 82002610
- Added to NRHP: September 09, 1982

The Gruwell and Crew General Store is one of the oldest buildings in West Branch, Iowa. Mayor S.C. Gruwell and J.C. Crew built the structure in 1894, it operated as a music store, harness shop, shoe repair shop, and as a variety store. In 1964 the West Branch Heritage Foundation converted it to a museum. The building has its original false-front facade and wooden ceiling, floor and walls. It is part of the West Branch Commercial Historic District.

Preservation Iowa has listed the Gruwell and Crew General Store on its most endangered list, citing its deteriorating condition and lack of support.

== History ==
The Gruwell and Crew General Store was listed on the National Register of Historic Places in September 1982.

== See also ==
- History of Colorado
