= Len Jus Building (Mason City, Iowa) =

Coordinates: 43.154°N 93.201°W

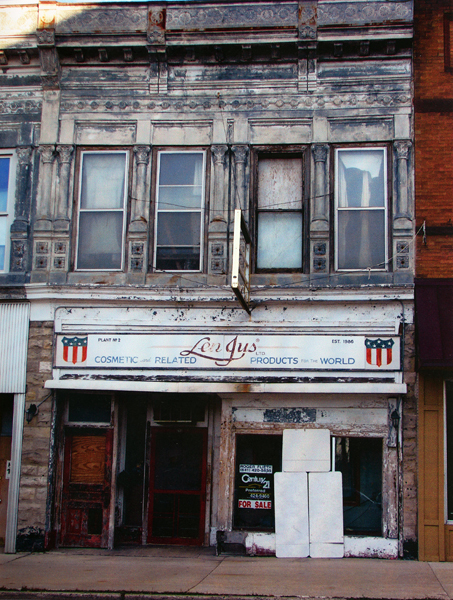
Len Jus Building.

The Len Jus Building on Federal Avenue in Mason City, Iowa was constructed in 1882. It has a rare sheet-metal facade, manufactured by the Mesker Brothers. This building has been placed on Preservation Iowa's Most Endangered list because of its poor repair and indifferent ownership.
