= West Branch, Iowa =

- City
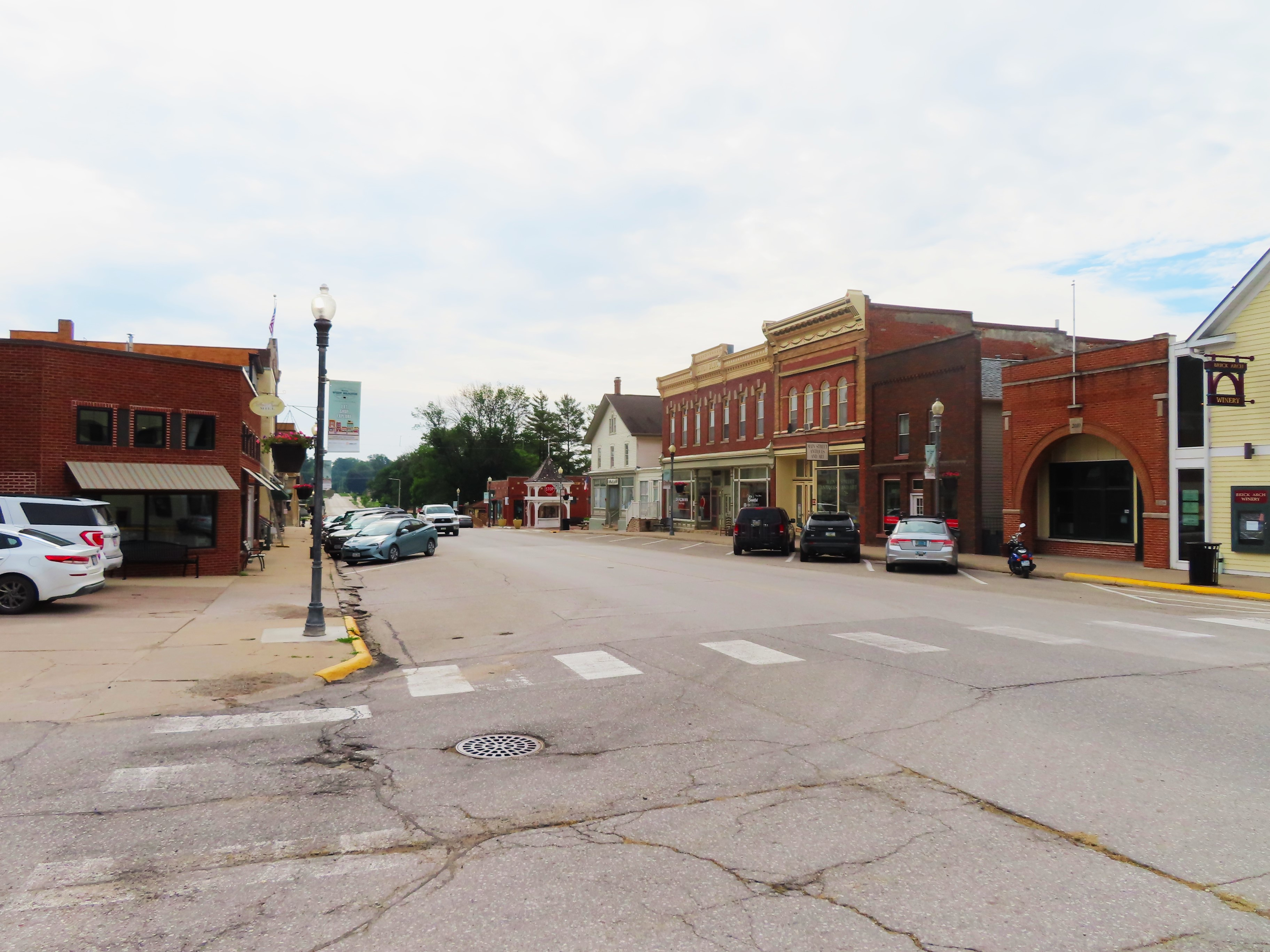
- Buildings on West Main Street in downtown West Branch
- Motto: A Heritage for Success
- Location of West Branch, Iowa
- Coordinates: 41°39′58″N 91°20′39″W
- Country: United States
- State: Iowa
- Counties: Cedar, Johnson
- Incorporated: April 12, 1875

Government
  - Mayor: Roger Laughlin

Area
  - Total: 2.57 sq mi (6.66 km^{2})
  - Land: 2.57 sq mi (6.66 km^{2})
  - Water: 0 sq mi (0.00 km^{2})
- Elevation: 742 ft (226 m)

Population (2020)
  - Total: 2,509
  - Density: 975.9/sq mi (376.79/km^{2})
- Time zone: UTC-6 (Central (CST))
  - Summer (DST): UTC-5 (CDT)
- ZIP code: 52358
- Area code: 319
- FIPS code: 19-83595
- GNIS feature ID: 2397261
- Website: www.westbranchiowa.org

West Branch is a city in Cedar and Johnson counties in the U.S. state of Iowa. The population was 2,509 as of the 2020 census. It is the birthplace of the only American president born in Iowa, Herbert Hoover.

The Johnson County portion of West Branch is part of the Iowa City metropolitan area.

== History ==
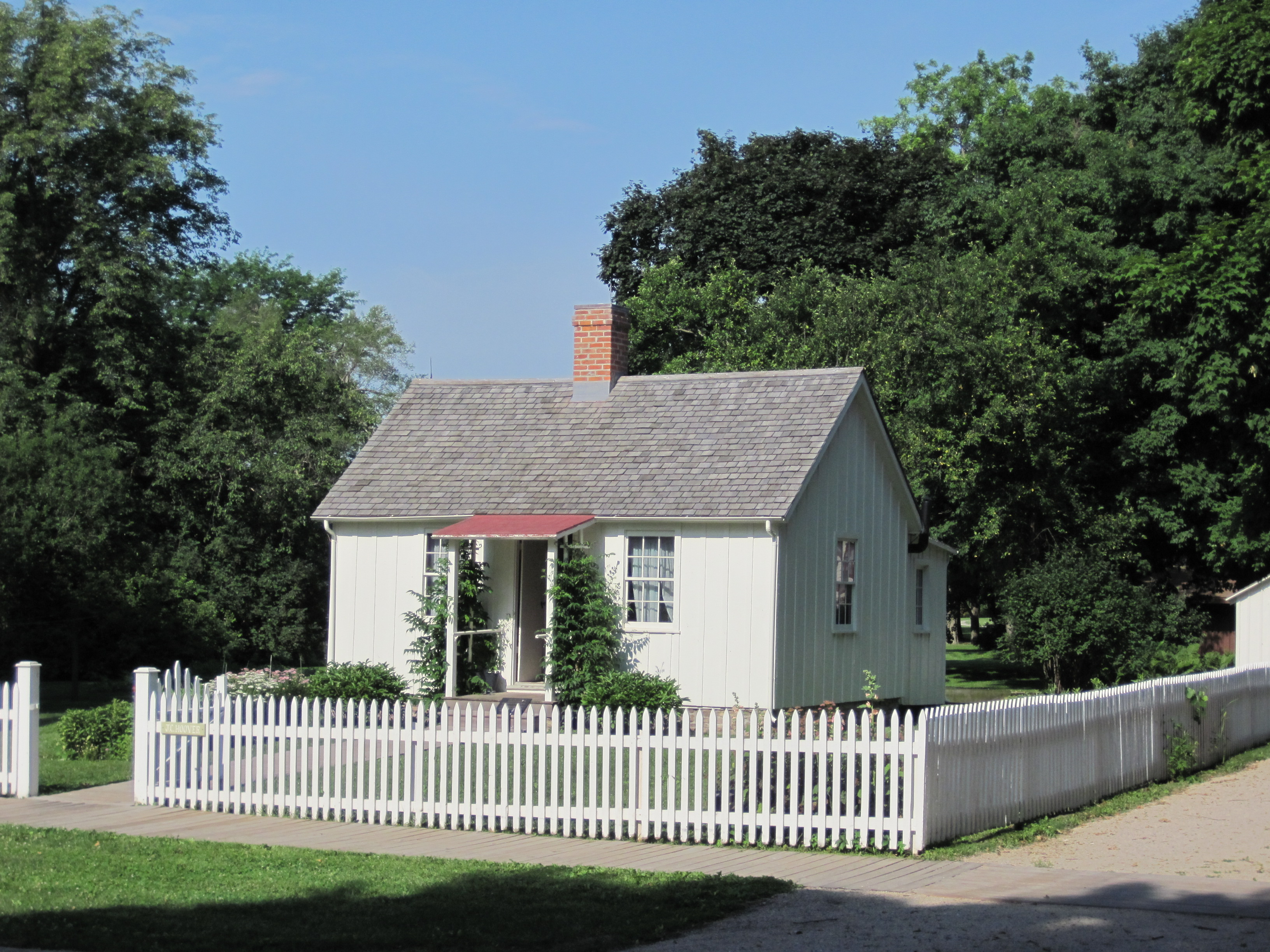
Herbert Hoover's birthplace cottage

West Branch was laid out in 1869 by Joseph Steer. It was incorporated in 1875.

The city was first settled chiefly by Quakers from Ohio. Its name is derived from the meeting place of the West Branch Quakers, and the location of the city on the west branch of the Wapsinonoc Creek. Most of Main Street is part of the West Branch Commercial Historic District.

Before the American Civil War, areas in and around West Branch were stops of the Underground Railroad. Abolitionist John Brown once stayed at the Maxson farm east of West Branch. He also stayed at James Townsend's inn, the Traveler's Rest, in the winter of 1856. In 2008, archaeologists found evidence of unmarked graves in nearby North Liberty Cemetery while investigating an account of 17 escaped slaves who died before reaching Canada.

West Branch experienced rapid growth after the Burlington, Cedar Rapids and Northern Railway was built through it.

President Herbert Hoover was born in West Branch in 1874. The Herbert Hoover Presidential Library and Museum was dedicated here by Hoover and his close friend, President Harry Truman, in 1962. The Herbert Hoover National Historic Site, which includes the Library-Museum, the Hoover Birthplace Cottage and the gravesites of President and Lou Henry Hoover, was authorized by Congress on August 12, 1965.

== Geography ==
According to the United States Census Bureau, the city has a total area of 3.19 square miles (8.26 km^{2}), all land.

West Branch is located approximately 10 miles (16 km) east of Iowa City, and 40 miles (64 km) west of Davenport.

== Demographics ==
Historical populations
Year	Pop.	±%
1880	501	—
1890	474	−5.4%
1900	647	+36.5%
1910	643	−0.6%
1920	688	+7.0%
1930	652	−5.2%
1940	719	+10.3%
1950	769	+7.0%
1960	1,053	+36.9%
1970	1,322	+25.5%
1980	1,867	+41.2%
1990	1,908	+2.2%
2000	2,188	+14.7%
2010	2,322	+6.1%
2020	2,509	+8.1%
Source:"U.S. Census website". United States Census Bureau. and Iowa Data Center; Source: U.S. Decennial Census

=== 2020 census ===
As of the 2020 census, West Branch had a population of 2,509, with 1,034 households and 649 families residing in the city. The median age was 41.0 years. 22.9% of residents were under the age of 18 and 19.4% were 65 years of age or older. For every 100 females there were 93.7 males, and for every 100 females age 18 and over there were 86.7 males age 18 and over.

By broader age bands, 25.5% of residents were under the age of 20, 4.7% were from 20 to 24, 24.9% were from 25 to 44, and 25.5% were from 45 to 64. The gender makeup of the city was 48.4% male and 51.6% female.

0.0% of residents lived in urban areas, while 100.0% lived in rural areas.

Of the 1,034 households, 28.9% had children under the age of 18 living with them. Of all households, 47.0% were married-couple households, 6.6% were cohabitating couples, 27.7% had a female householder with no spouse or partner present, and 18.8% had a male householder with no spouse or partner present. 37.2% of all households were non-families. About 32.1% of all households were made up of individuals, and 13.2% had someone living alone who was 65 years of age or older.

The population density was 975.9 inhabitants per square mile (376.8/km^{2}). There were 1,128 housing units at an average density of 438.7 per square mile (169.4/km^{2}). Of all housing units, 8.3% were vacant. The homeowner vacancy rate was 3.7% and the rental vacancy rate was 4.3%.

Racial composition as of the 2020 census
Race	Number	Percent
White	2,289	91.2%
Black or African American	16	0.6%
American Indian and Alaska Native	3	0.1%
Asian	13	0.5%
Native Hawaiian and Other Pacific Islander	0	0.0%
Some other race	47	1.9%
Two or more races	141	5.6%
Hispanic or Latino (of any race)	129	5.1%

=== 2010 census ===
As of the census of 2010, there were 2,322 people, 947 households, and 612 families residing in the city. The population density was 727.9 inhabitants per square mile (281.0/km^{2}). There were 990 housing units at an average density of 310.3 per square mile (119.8/km^{2}). The racial makeup of the city was 97.0% White, 0.4% African American, 0.2% Native American, 0.6% Asian, 0.4% from other races, and 1.3% from two or more races. Hispanic or Latino of any race were 2.1% of the population.

There were 947 households, of which 33.8% had children under the age of 18 living with them, 50.2% were married couples living together, 9.3% had a female householder with no husband present, 5.2% had a male householder with no wife present, and 35.4% were non-families. 28.2% of all households were made up of individuals, and 7.9% had someone living alone who was 65 years of age or older. The average household size was 2.39 and the average family size was 2.92.

The median age in the city was 38.7 years. 24.6% of residents were under the age of 18; 8% were between the ages of 18 and 24; 25.5% were from 25 to 44; 28.4% were from 45 to 64; and 13.5% were 65 years of age or older. The gender makeup of the city was 48.8% male and 51.2% female.

=== 2000 census ===
As of the census of 2000, there were 2,341 people, 840 households, and 572 families residing in the city. The population density was 1,106.8 inhabitants per square mile (427.3/km^{2}). There were 876 housing units at an average density of 443.1 per square mile (171.1/km^{2}). The racial makeup of the city was 96.71% White, 0.37% African American, 0.41% Native American, 0.91% Asian, 0.05% Pacific Islander, 0.59% from other races, and 0.96% from two or more races. Hispanic or Latino of any race were 1.74% of the population.

There were 840 households, out of which 37.6% had children under the age of 18 living with them, 53.7% were married couples living together, 10.5% had a female householder with no husband present, and 31.8% were non-families. 25.4% of all households were made up of individuals, and 8.7% had someone living alone who was 65 years of age or older. The average household size was 2.51 and the average family size was 3.03.

26.9% are under the age of 18, 7.7% from 18 to 24, 30.2% from 25 to 44, 21.4% from 45 to 64, and 13.8% who were 65 years of age or older. The median age was 36 years. For every 100 females, there were 90.4 males. For every 100 females age 18 and over, there were 89.3 males.

The median income for a household in the city was $42,500, and the median income for a family was $51,667. Males had a median income of $31,949 versus $26,379 for females. The per capita income for the city was $19,577. About 4.5% of families and 4.7% of the population were below the poverty line, including 5.1% of those under age 18 and 9.9% of those age 65 or over.

== Economy ==
West Branch has been one of 36 communities in the Main Street Iowa program since being accepted on June 1, 2006. The program encourages downtown economic development through historic preservation.

The city's industrial park is home to a major distribution center of Cincinnati-based Procter & Gamble. The building is 550,000 square feet (51,000 m^{2}) and as of 2007, is undergoing an expansion. The industrial park is also home to Plastic Products, Wausau, Acciona Windpower North America and, Tidewater Direct.

As of November 2007, construction was completed on Acciona Energía's wind turbine generator engineering and assembly plant, the first in North America. Production began at the plant in December 2007.

== Media ==
West Branch Times has been in continuous publication since 1875.

== Arts and culture ==
=== Museums ===
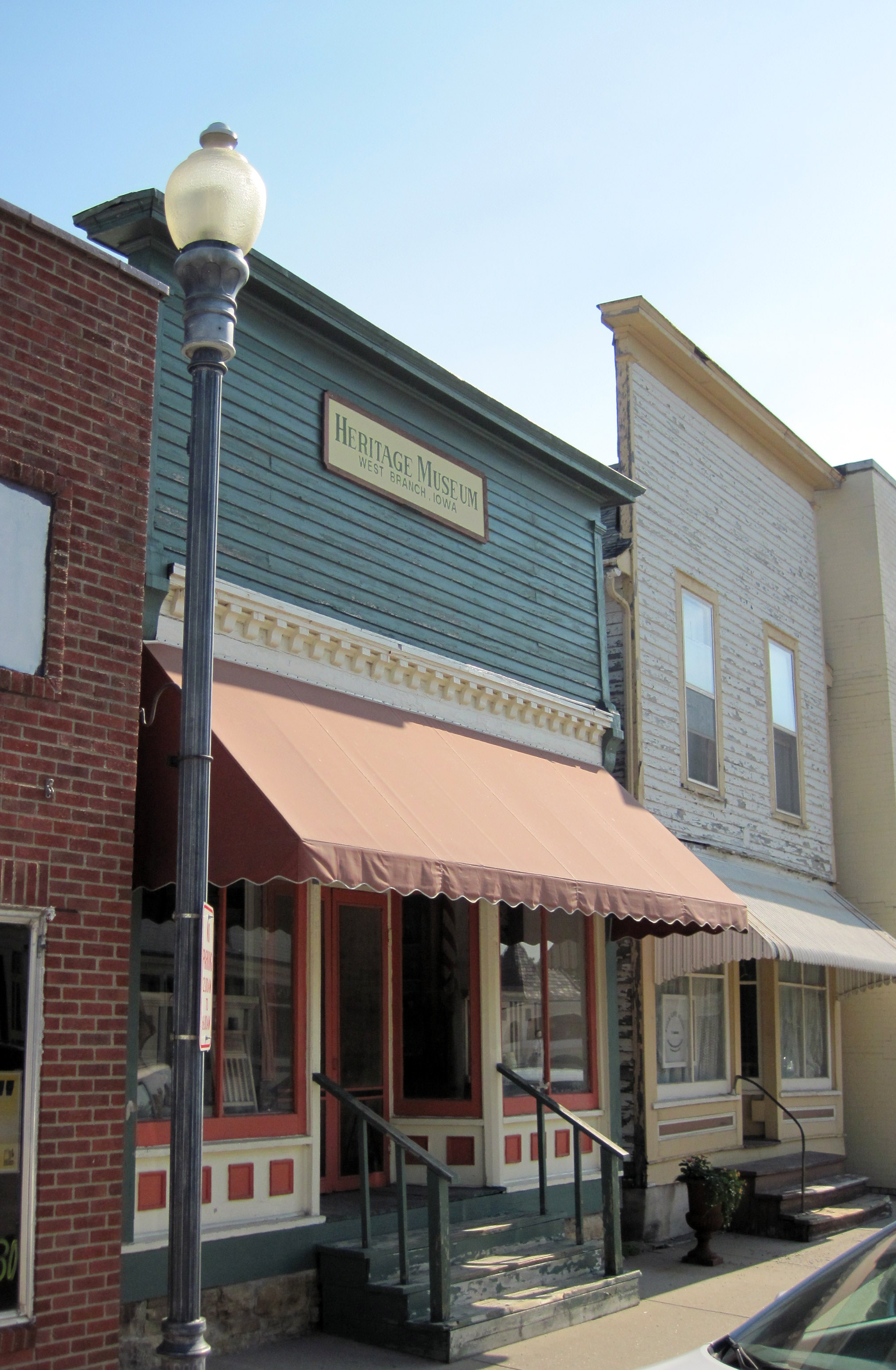
Gruwell and Crew General Store

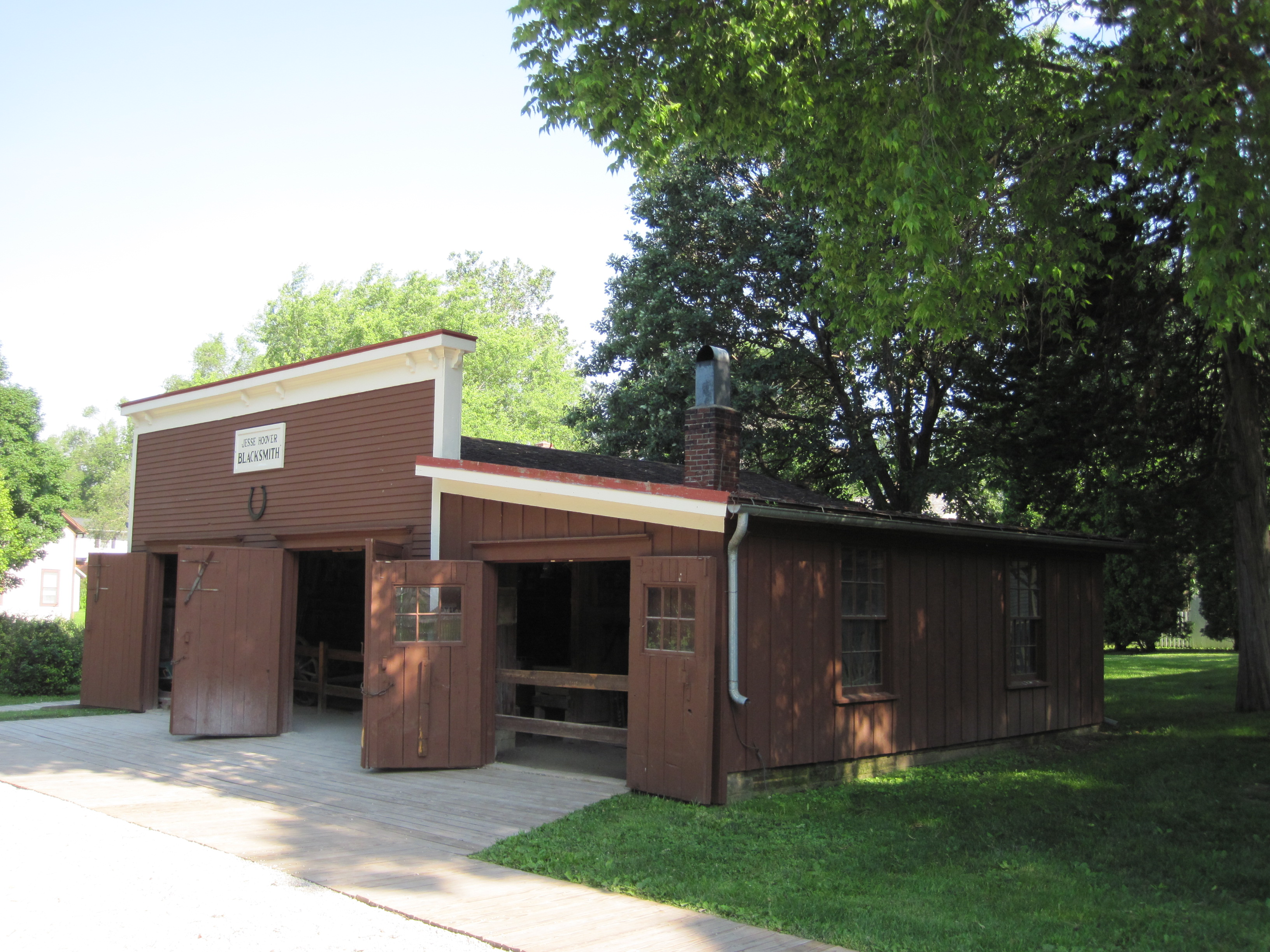
The reconstructed Jesse Hoover blacksmith shop

West Branch is home to the Herbert Hoover National Historic Site, run by the National Park Service and Herbert Hoover Presidential Library and Museum, run by the National Archives and Records Administration. The library holds the documentary legacy of Rose Wilder Lane and her mother, Laura Ingalls Wilder.

=== Landmarks ===
The Gruwell and Crew General Store is listed on the National Register of Historic Places. It was named as one of the most endangered historic properties in Iowa by the Iowa Historic Preservation Alliance in 2008.

Butch Pedersen Field, formerly known as Oliphant Street Field, the playing field for the West Branch High School football team, is situated just northwest of downtown. Colloquially known as "the Little Rose Bowl", it was constructed by the Works Progress Administration by excavating a sloped field, yielding a playing field with natural seating on three sides.

== Education ==
The West Branch Community School District operates local public schools. It has about 800 students and includes three schools: Hoover Elementary, West Branch Middle School and West Branch High School.

Scattergood Friends School, a Quaker boarding school, is located east of the city.

== Infrastructure ==
=== Transportation ===
Interstate 80 passes from west to east through West Branch.

== Notable people ==
- Marv Cook, football player
- Fine printers Harry Duncan and Allan Kornblum each printed and published books in West Branch.
- Mildred Adams Fenton, paleontologist
- Herbert Hoover (1874–1964), 31st President of the United States (1929-1933)
- Patrick A. Murphy (born 1958), Adjutant General of New York
- Dave Rummells, PGA Tour golfer
