= Union Block (Mount Pleasant, Iowa) =

- U.S. National Register of Historic Places

- Location within Iowa Location within the United States
- Location: 109--113 W. Monroe; Mount Pleasant, Iowa
- Coordinates: 40°57′56″N 91°33′13″W
- Built: 1861
- Architect: McCandless, William
- Architectural style: Italianate, Vernacular Italianate
- MPS: Mount Pleasant MPS
- NRHP reference No.: 91001110
- Added to NRHP: September 06, 1991

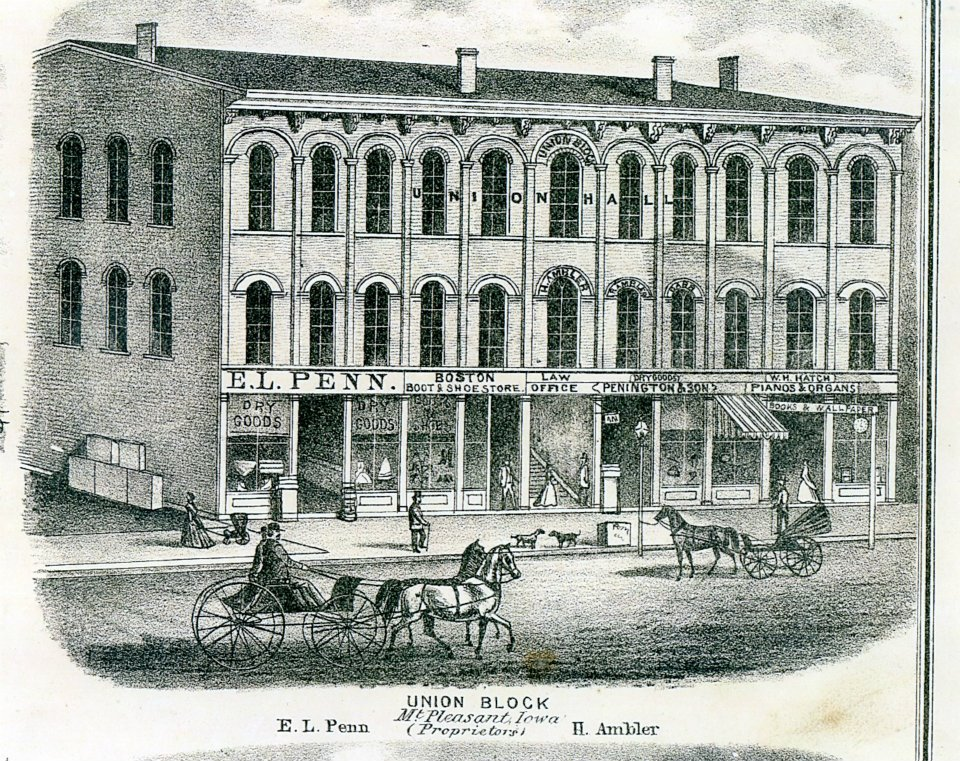
Union Block in 1870.

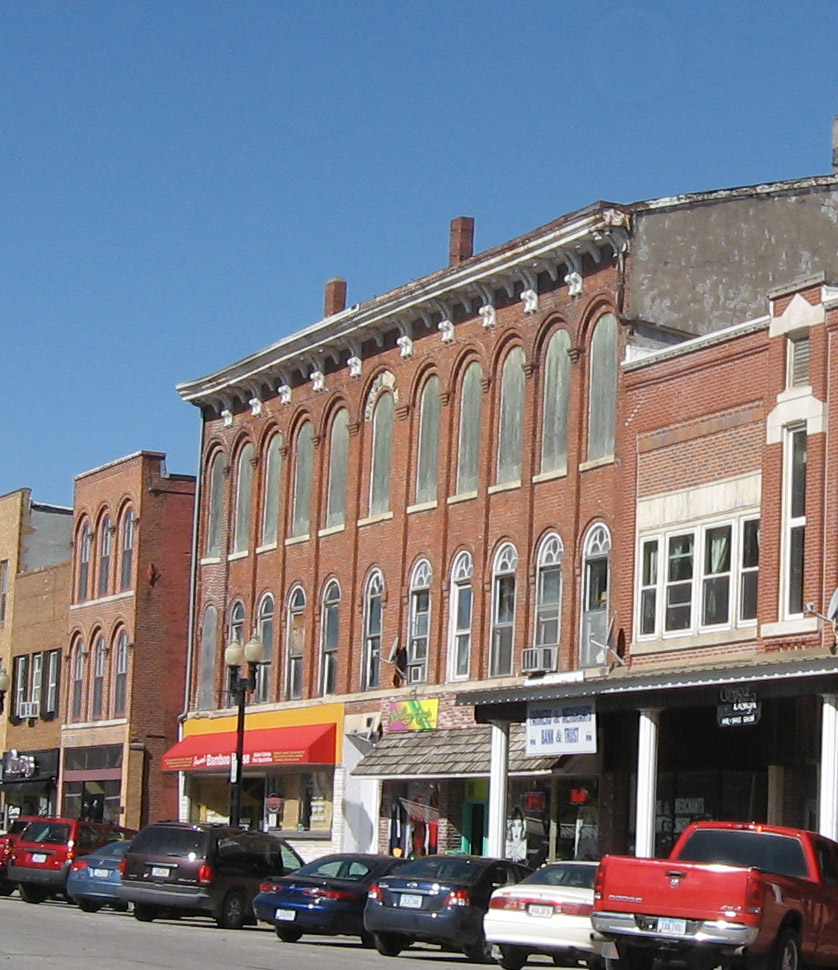
Union block, 2008, before fire and renovation

The Union Block of Mount Pleasant, Iowa, was built by William McCandless in 1861. Historically it was used as offices and by the county courts. In the Union Block in 1869, Arabella A. Mansfield became the first woman in the United States to be awarded a license to practice law. The third floor housed the Opera House or Union Hall, a gathering place for the community. Early supporters of women's rights and civil rights spoke there, including Frederick Douglass, Bronson Alcott, Anna Dickinson, and possibly Elizabeth Cady Stanton. Preservation Iowa had listed Union Block on its most endangered buildings list because of its poor condition and lack of preservation plan. The building was badly damaged by an early morning fire on Jan. 25, 2011.

== Preservation Campaign & Restoration ==
The Union Block Revitalization Committee was formed to raise awareness and funds for the restoration of the Union Block. Money was raised by the people in the community and the building was renovated. It reopened in August 2014 housing businesses on the first and second floors. The ballroom was restored and updated on the third floor making it a hall used for a variety of community gatherings, events, and private parties.
