= Herbert Hoover National Historic Site =

National Historic Site of the United States

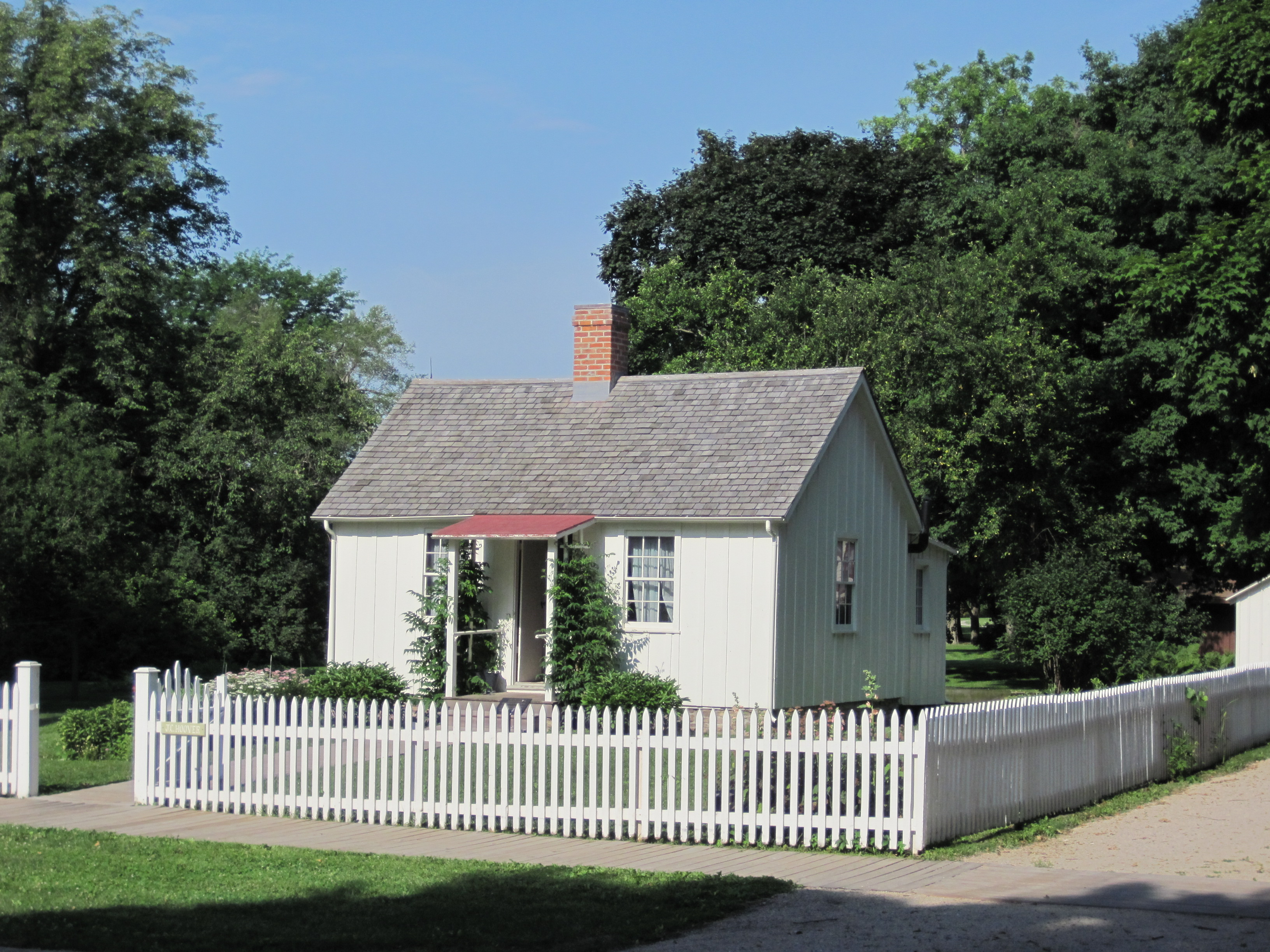
- Herbert Hoover Birthplace Cottage

- Location within Iowa Location within the United States
- Location: West Branch, Iowa, US
- Nearest city: Iowa City, Iowa
- Coordinates: 41°40′8″N 91°20′53″W
- Area: 186.8 acres (75.6 ha)
- Established: August 12, 1965
- Visitors: 106,672 (in 2025)
- Governing body: National Park Service
- Website: Herbert Hoover National Historic Site
- Herbert Hoover National Historic Site
- U.S. National Register of Historic Places
- U.S. National Historic Landmark District
- NRHP reference No.: 66000110 (original); 13000594 (increase)

Significant dates
- Added to NRHP: October 15, 1966
- Boundary increase: August 14, 2013
- Designated NHLD: June 23, 1965

The Herbert Hoover National Historic Site is a unit of the National Park System in West Branch, Iowa, United States. The buildings and grounds are managed by the National Park Service to commemorate the life of Herbert Hoover, the 31st president of the United States. The park was established in 1965, shortly after it was named a National Historic Landmark. It now encompasses 186.8 acres (75.6 ha).

Hoover spent the first eleven years of his life in West Branch. The son of a blacksmith who practiced close to the town, Hoover was born in a small cottage in 1874. The family later moved nearby to the "House of the Maples", a two-story house. Within the next few years, Hoover was orphaned and left West Branch to live with relatives in Oregon. Hoover would go on to become a successful mining engineer, humanitarian, and President of the United States.

The birthplace cottage fell into private hands and became a tourist destination following Hoover's nomination to the presidency in 1928. After the Hoover family acquired the cottage in the 1930s, they worked to develop a park aimed at recreating Hoover's formative childhood experience. Among the buildings that now stand in the park are a blacksmith shop similar to the one owned by his father, the first West Branch schoolhouse, and the Quaker meetinghouse where the Hoover family worshiped. In the 1960s, the Herbert Hoover Presidential Library and Museum first opened to maintain Hoover's presidential papers and memorabilia. Herbert and his wife, First Lady Lou Henry Hoover, are buried under a monument designed by William Wagner. After the death of Herbert Hoover, an 81-acre (33 ha) tallgrass prairie was developed.

== History ==
=== Birthplace and childhood home ===
Herbert Clark Hoover spent the first eleven years of his life in West Branch, Iowa, a small farming community with a population around 500. His birthplace cottage was built in the spring of 1871 at the corner of Penn and Downey Streets. The two-room cottage, built for recent settlers Jesse Clark Hoover and his wife Hulda, was only 14 by 20 feet (4.3 m × 6.1 m) and had two rooms. Jesse and Hulda were both Quakers. Jesse was a blacksmith, and opened a shop shortly after settling. The cottage was built on a stone foundation and built with board and batten timber. The timber was cut in a sawmill in Muscatine.

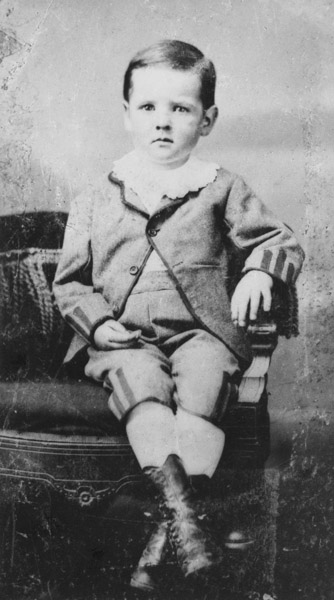
Herbert Hoover in 1877

On August 10, 1874, Herbert (known in his childhood as "Bert" or "Bertie") was born as the second child to Jesse and Hulda. Jesse's blacksmith had grown to be very successful, and in 1878, Jesse Hoover sold the practice to open a farm implement store on the corner of Main and Downey Streets. In March 1879, the family moved to the House of the Maples, a two-story frame house. Hoover may have attended classes at an 1853 schoolhouse at the corner of Main and Downey Streets. He attended Quaker services at the nearby Friends Meetinghouse.

The prosperity of the Hoover family suddenly ended on December 13, 1880, when Jesse died of rheumatic fever. Hulda supported the family by sewing and taking in boarders. However, Hulda died of typhoid fever on February 24, 1884. Now an orphan, nine-year-old Herbert Hoover was sent to live with his uncle Allan Hoover on a nearby farm. Two years later, Hoover was sent to Newberg, Oregon to live with another uncle.

=== Hoover career and presidency ===
Herbert Hoover became a prosperous mining engineer, becoming very wealthy after working in Australia and China. He married Lou Henry in 1899. During World War I, Hoover was moved by a food crisis in Europe. Hoover oversaw operations for the Commission for Relief in Belgium to feed the nation of Belgium throughout the war. After the United States entered the war, Hoover was appointed the head of the U.S. Food Administration. Hoover was lauded for his efforts in his homeland. He campaigned on behalf of Warren G. Harding in 1920, who rewarded Hoover by appointing him Secretary of Commerce in his cabinet.

In 1928, Hoover was considered the leading candidate for president by the Republican Party. He defeated Al Smith in a landslide. However, his term was marred by the economic downturn of the Great Depression. Despite efforts to right the economy, Hoover was himself defeated in a landslide in 1932 to Franklin D. Roosevelt. During World War II, Hoover was again tasked with providing food to war-torn countries.

=== Gravesite ===
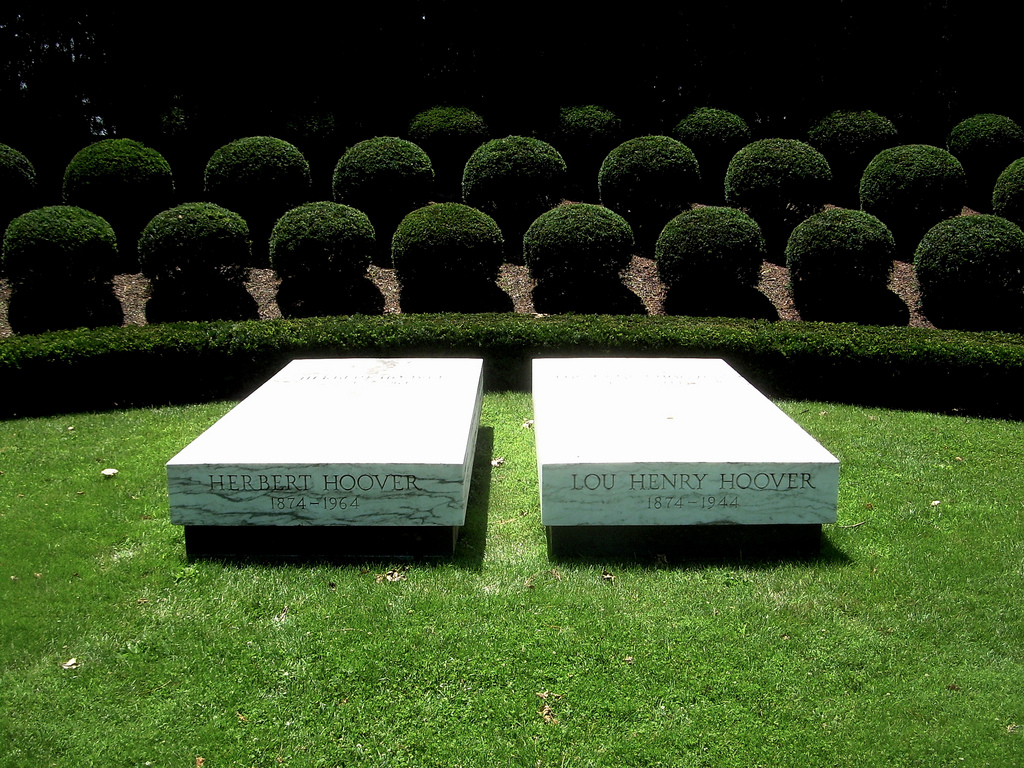
The gravesite of Hoover and Lou Henry Hoover

Herbert Hoover died from internal bleeding in 1964, enjoying the longest retirement of any President to that point. Hoover considered his years in West Branch to be his most formative, and requested that he and his wife (who had died twenty years earlier) be buried there. Allan Hoover selected the site, which was landscaped before Herbert Hoover's death. 100,000 people lined the funeral procession route between Cedar Rapids and West Branch. William Wagner designed the memorial in collaboration with surviving Hoover family members. Standing at the foot of the monument, one can see the birthplace cottage.

== Historic development ==
R. Portland and Jennie Scellers purchased the cottage in 1889. They moved it to the rear of the property and turned it so that it faced south. They then built a two-story house and connected it to the cottage. In 1928, when Hoover was nominated as president, tourists began to come to West Branch to see the birthplace of the candidate. The widowed Jennie Scellers opened the cottage to the public. Charging ten cents a tour, she entertained over 17,000 visitors in the first year alone. Enjoying the profitability of the building, Scellers refused to sell the property to the Hoover family, but upon her death in 1934, the house was sold to Hoover's son Allan. He demolished the two-story house and turned the cottage back to its original orientation (facing east).

Hoover and his family believed that, by recreating the surroundings of his early life, visitors could be inspired by the experience. After Allan purchased the cottage in 1935, the Hoovers began work on developing the environment. By 1938, the cottage had been restored by the Hoover Birthplace Committee, a group founded to support Hoover's 1928 campaign stop in West Branch. Lou Henry was the de facto leader of the group until her death in 1944. She oversaw all of the early developments, including the relocation of the Isis statue and the acquisition of land around the birthplace. She also developed a retaining wall for Hoover Creek and had a footpath built over it to connect the cottage with Isis. She installed trees, shrubs, and flowers from a Marion garden. Allan Hoover took over the project following his mother's death.

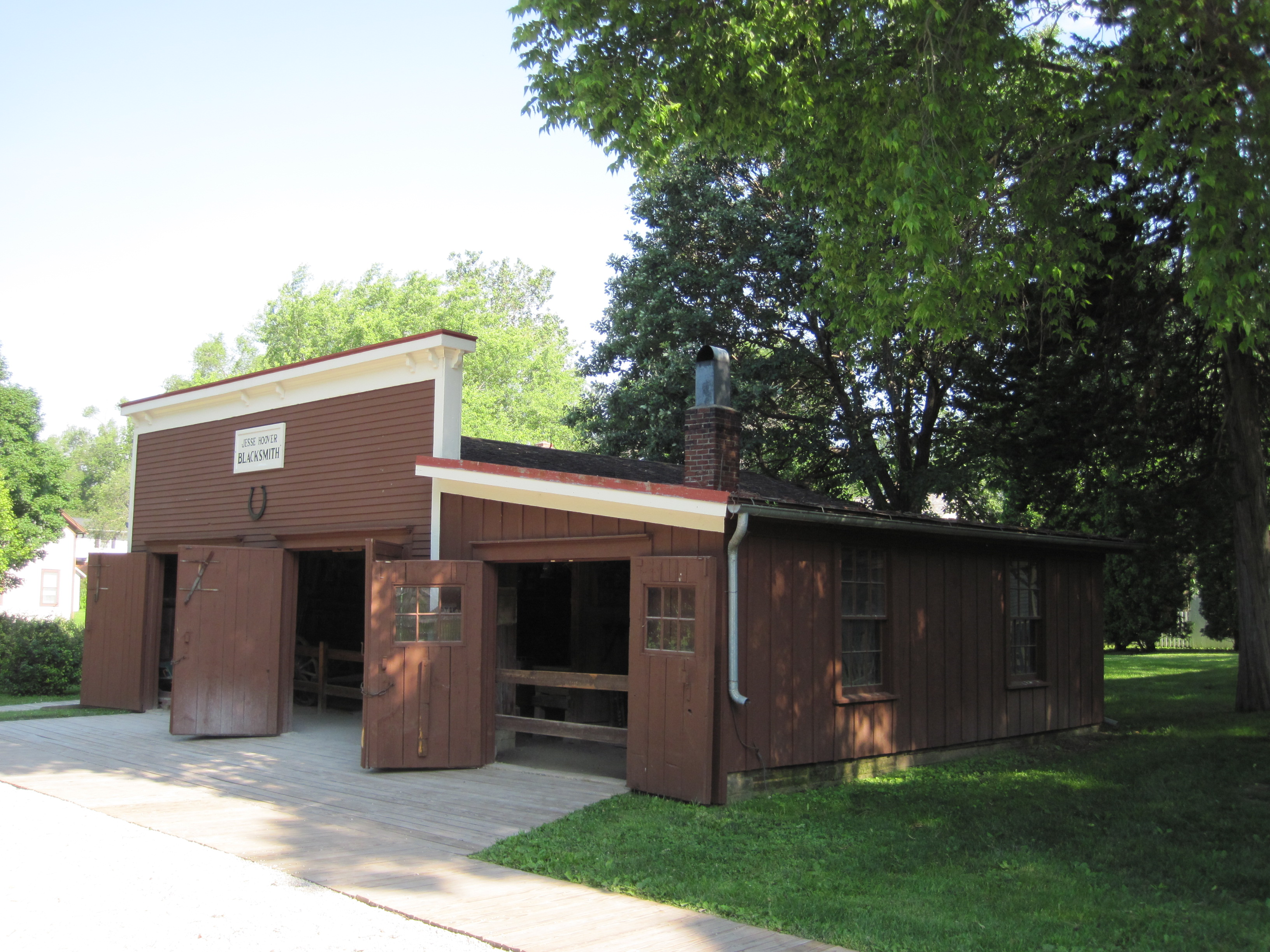
The Jesse Hoover blacksmith shop was rebuilt in the 1950s based on archaeological findings on the site and family recollections of the structure.

The birthplace park hosted the first Hoover Day celebration of Hoover's 74th birthday in 1948. The large crowds that came to celebrate the Iowan inspired Allan Hoover to further develop the site in time for his father's 80th birthday in 1954. The Herbert Hoover Birthplace Park was officially dedicated on June 30, 1952. The following year, a comfort station and picnic shelter were constructed; these have both since been demolished. In collaboration with the Hoover celebration in 1954, the Boy Scouts of America built another picnic shelter and dedicated a bronze plaque to the former president. In 1957, the Hoover family decided to recreate the Jesse Hoover blacksmith shop, which was rebuilt using wood reclaimed from an 1870 barn. The blacksmith shop is a working shop producing various iron items for sale and replacement period hardware for the NPS.

In the late 1950s, the park was greatly expanded in response to the proposed Interstate 80, which would pass just south of the park. These land acquisitions maintained the integrity of the site. The Birthplace Society moved a 1905 house to the park in 1964 to serve as the house of the Director of the Presidential Library. The house has since been transferred to the Herbert Hoover Presidential Library Association, who use it as offices. Around the same time, the Birthplace Society moved the Quaker Meetinghouse to the site. Although the Hoovers were originally opposed to the idea, since the church was originally far from the house, they relented when learning of a demolition threat. It was the last building moved to the site before Hoover's death.

== National Historic Site ==
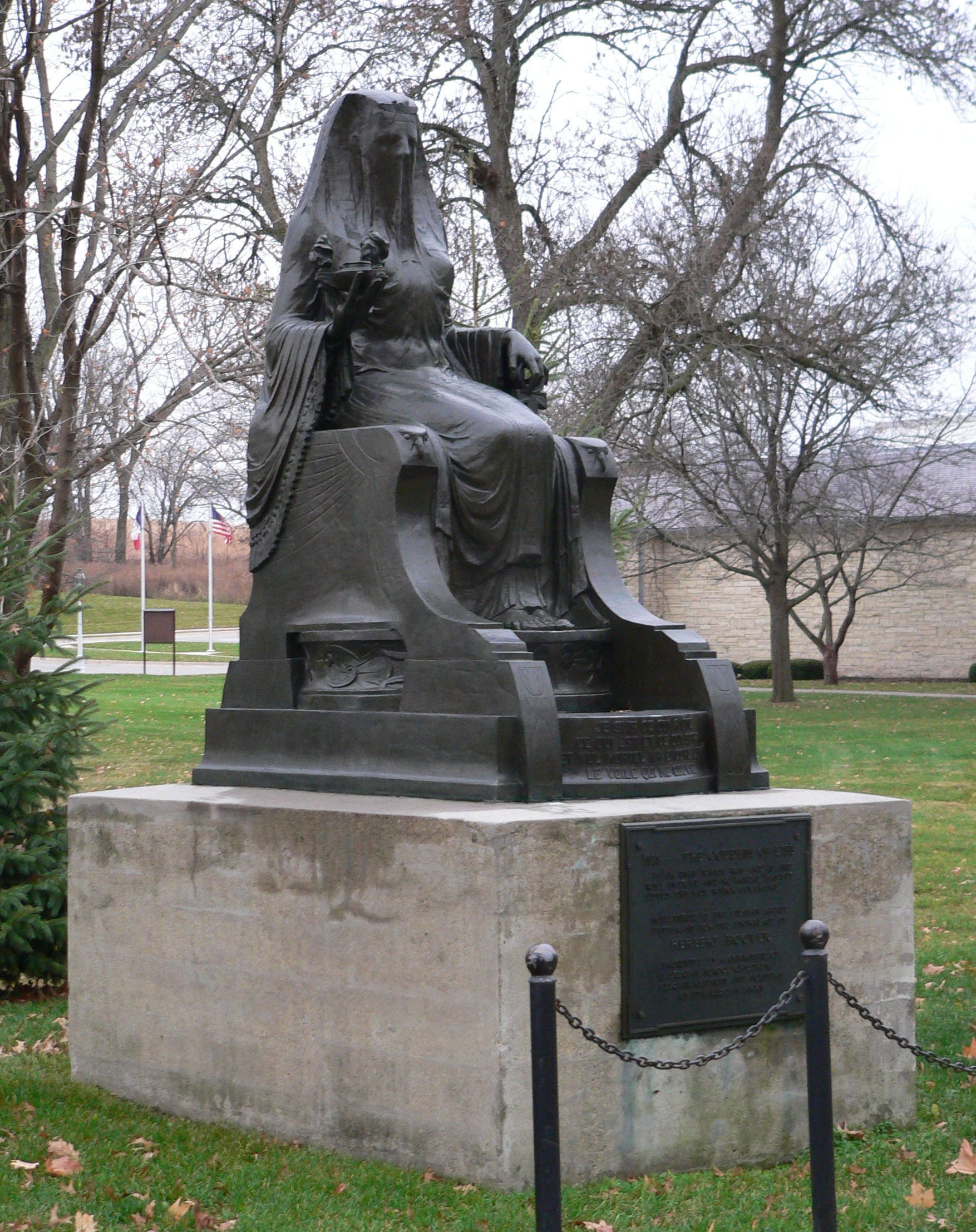
The statue of Isis by Auguste Puttemans was presented to the Hoovers on behalf of the Belgian government.

As the Herbert Hoover Birthplace, the site was declared a 28-acre (11 ha) National Historic Landmark on June 23, 1965. The National Historic Site was established on August 12, 1965. When the National Register of Historic Places was created a year later, the site was automatically listed. The complex originally included twenty-eight buildings, fourteen sites, eight structures, and eight objects over 67.49 acres (27.31 ha). In 2013, the site was redefined to include thirteen buildings, one site, two structures, and one object over 119.31 acres (48.28 ha).

The National Historic Site features West Branch several buildings that would have been standing during Hoover's childhood there. The 1853 schoolhouse was moved to the site near its original location. Likewise, the Friends Meetinghouse where Hoover worshiped has been moved to the site. Jesse Hoover's blacksmith shop has been rebuilt. These four buildings are open for free touring. The gravesite overlooking the cottage can also be visited. Near the gravesite is a tallgrass prairie, designed to resemble the type of landscape that early West Branch settlers would have witnessed. The prairie was named a National Recreation Trail in 1981.

The large statue of the Egyptian deity Isis was presented to Hoover as a gift from the people of Belgium, in gratitude for his famine relief efforts on behalf of their country during the war. Sculpted by Belgian native Auguste Puttemans, the statue originally decorated Hoover's home in Palo Alto, California. The Hoovers brought it to West Branch in 1939, located "contemplating the house" where Hoover was born.

The site also includes historic houses on Downey and Poplar Streets that belonged to significant West Branch residents. These houses are not open to the public. Some of the historic house are used for park operations and storage, while others have been available as housing for park staff. In 2021 the NPS posted an RFEI for adaptive use of the Staples, Wright, and Hayhurst houses.

In 2020, the park service embarked on a multi-year flood mitigation project for Hoover creek, a tributary of the West Branch Wapsinonoc creek which runs through the site. The project involved widening the existing creek channel, replacement of bridges, and the construction of a 10-acre retention basin in the park's tallgrass prairie.

=== Downey Street ===
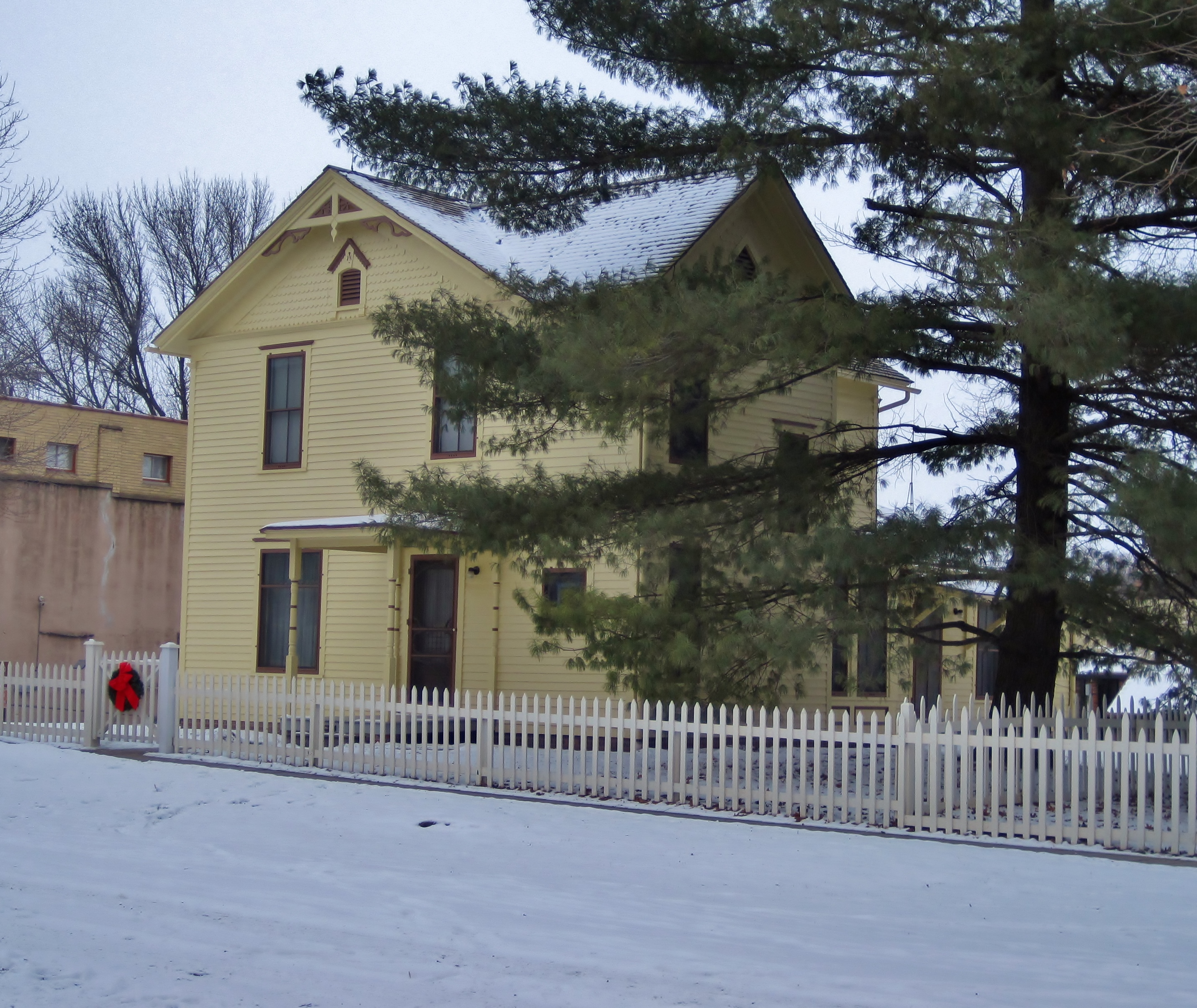
Laban Miles House

Laban Miles was the brother-in-law of Hulda Hoover. The Miles and Hoover families became close friends, and Herbert would play with the Miles children. Laban Miles later served Rutherford B. Hayes as an Indian agent. Hoover briefly lived with the Miles family in 1882 on the Osage Nation reservation while permanent plans were being made for his rearing. A farmstead owned by the Miles family south of the residential district is also part of the park. Also on Downey Street is the Amanda Garvin House, a fine example of Gothic Revival architecture. The Charles E. Smith House was moved to the site in 1969. Smith built his house in 1903, after Hoover had already left West Branch. However, the National Park Service decided to move the house to the site because of its Queen Anne architecture. His sister was the wife of Dr. L. J. Leech, who also lived on the street. Leech lived in Miles' house after moving to West Branch in 1884. While the Miles family foreclosed on their house, Leech purchased it and lived there. He built his own house next door in 1920.

Hannah Varney built her house in 1899 after her divorce from her husband. She lived there for a year before moving to Iowa City and remarried. Her daughters Cora and Clara lived in the house until 1915. The house was moved to its present site in 1967. The P. T. Smith House was the only West Branch house that Hoover distinctly remembered when visiting the town years later. The Hoover children and the Smith children often played together, particularly enjoying sledding on nearby Cook's Hill.

=== Poplar Street ===
Four houses are maintained on Poplar Street. The Wright family built a house there in 1873. Like Jesse Hoover, Billy Wright was a blacksmith. E. S. Hayhurst built a house in 1872, but foreclosed on it in 1878. Real estate developer John Wetherell and his wife built a house in 1872 and sold it four years later to the retired Dr. John Staples. David Mackey purchased a house in 1869. Mackey was a carpenter and built the house himself. Shortly after completion, he died, leaving the house to his wife, son, and sister. The widower was elected mayor of West Branch in 1879. Of all the houses on the two streets, the Mackey and Wright Houses have been the least altered since their construction.

=== Presidential library and museum ===
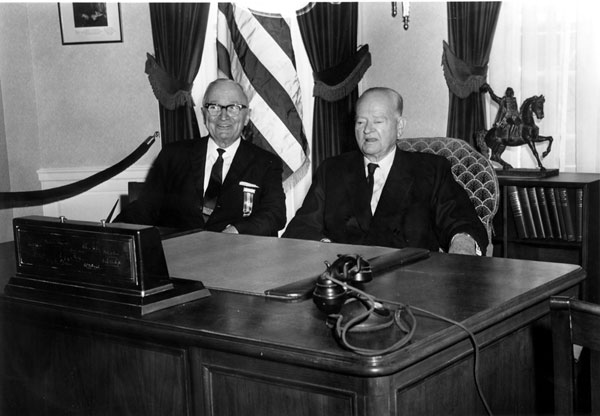
Truman and Hoover at the dedication ceremony for the Herbert Hoover Presidential Library and Museum.

In 1939, Franklin D. Roosevelt established the first Presidential library, a collection of his presidential papers. He donated land and memorabilia to the government and built the structure with private funds. The recently developed National Archives and Records Administration was tasked with its oversight. President Truman followed suit in 1945, announcing that he intended to build a similar library. In response, the United States Congress passed the Presidential Libraries Act of 1955, establishing a system of Presidential libraries.

Hoover originally intended to simply donate his papers to his alma mater, Stanford University, and set up a small museum of memorabilia in West Branch. However, as the relationship between him and Stanford soured in the 1950s, Hoover decided to erect a presidential library and museum. The Herbert Hoover Presidential Library and Museum was the fourth such institution, opening on Hoover's 88th birthday, August 10, 1962. It is one of three libraries in the system that include the birthplace or boyhood home and gravesite of the President.

The opening ceremony was dedicated by Harry Truman and Hoover gave a speech. The library and museum was rededicated by President Ronald Reagan following a massive expansion in 1992. The museum is the only part of the National Historic Site that requires an entrance fee ($12 for adults).

== In popular culture ==
Grant Wood depicted the Herbert Hoover Birthplace in his 1931 piece, The Birthplace of Herbert Hoover, West Branch, Iowa. The painting was produced before the demolition of the Portland Scellers extension and relocation of the original cottage, so the face of the birthplace itself is obscured at the rear of the building in the center.

== See also ==
- List of residences of presidents of the United States
- List of National Historic Landmarks in Iowa
- List of areas in the United States National Park System
- West Branch Commercial Historic District, a nearby commercial district
- Hoover–Minthorn House, Hoover's childhood home in Oregon
- Lou Henry and Herbert Hoover House, their house in Palo Alto, California from 1920 to 1944
- Rapidan Camp, Hoover's rustic retreat in Shenandoah National Park, Virginia
- Hoover Dam, named after Hoover and began during his presidency
