= Arabella Mansfield =

American lawyer

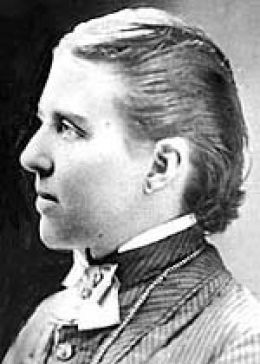
- Mansfield, c. 1870
- Born: Belle Aurelia Babb; May 23, 1846; Benton Township, Iowa
- Died: August 2, 1911 (aged 65)
- Education: Iowa Wesleyan College
- Occupations: Lawyer, educator
- Spouse: John Mansfield

Arabella Mansfield (May 23, 1846 – August 2, 1911), born Belle Aurelia Babb, became the first female lawyer in the United States in 1869, admitted to the Iowa bar; she made her career as a college educator and administrator. Despite an Iowa state law restricting the bar exam to males, Mansfield had taken it and earned high scores. Shortly after her court challenge, Iowa amended its licensing statute and became the first state to accept women and minorities into its bar.

During her career, Mansfield worked primarily as an educator and activist, teaching at Iowa Wesleyan College and DePauw University. At the latter, she also became a university administrator, serving successively as dean in the 1890s of two different schools.

== Early life and education ==
Arabella Aurelia Babb (known as Belle) was born in 1846 on a family farm in Benton Township, Des Moines County, Iowa, as the second child to Mary (Moyer) (1820–1895) and Miles Babb. Her elder brother, Washington Irving Babb, born in 1844 and named after the prominent New York author, was her lifelong friend. While Belle was young, her father left for California, April 10, 1850, on the Flint River Company wagon train. Prior to his departure he signed a will making provisions for the educations of his children. Miles became superintendent of the Bay State Mining Company and was killed in the collapse of a mining tunnel at the Mameluke Hill mine in El Dorado County, California, December 23, 1852.

Mary Babb moved with their two children to Mt. Pleasant, Iowa, where they attended local schools. (Clara Foltz, the first woman lawyer to be accepted to the bar on the West Coast, also grew up in Mount Pleasant around this time.)

In 1862, Babb started her studies at Iowa Wesleyan College in Mount Pleasant. There she began using the name Arabella (previously, she had gone by her given name of Belle). As many men were leaving to fight in the American Civil War, universities were admitting more women students and hiring them as teachers. Arabella Babb graduated in three years as valedictorian; her brother Washington Babb was salutatorian in the same class.

== Career ==
The historic Union Block building in Mount Pleasant, where Mansfield took her oath as the first female lawyer in the U.S.

Babb taught at Des Moines Conference Seminary (now Simpson College) in Indianola, Iowa for a year. She returned to Mount Pleasant to marry her college sweetheart, John Melvin Mansfield, a young professor at Iowa Wesleyan. He encouraged her in her ambition to study law. Arabella Mansfield "read the law" as an apprentice in her brother Washington's law office, after he had passed the bar and established his practice. Although by Iowa law the bar exam was restricted to "males over 21," Arabella Mansfield took the exam in 1869, passing it with high scores.

In 1869, Iowa became the first state in the union to admit women to the practice of law after Mansfield challenged the state law excluding her. The Court ruled that women may not be denied the right to practice law in Iowa, admitting Mansfield to the bar. Mansfield was sworn in at the Union Block building in Mount Pleasant that year.

Although admitted to the bar, Mansfield did not practice law, concentrating on college teaching and activist work. She taught at Iowa Wesleyan College, followed by DePauw University in Greencastle, Indiana. In 1893 she was selected as Dean of the School of Art at DePauw, and in 1894 as Dean of the School of Music. In 1893, Mansfield joined the National League of Women Lawyers.

Mansfield was also active in the women's suffrage movement, chairing the Iowa Women’s Suffrage Convention in 1870, and working with Susan B. Anthony.

Mansfield died August 1, 1911, at the home of her brother, Washington I. Babb, in Aurora, Illinois, before getting to see the suffrage movement’s ultimate achievement: passage of the Nineteenth Amendment to the United States Constitution, effective in 1920.

== Legacy and honors ==
- In 1980, Arabella Mansfield was inducted into the Iowa Women's Hall of Fame.
- In 2002 the Iowa Organization of Women Attorneys established the Arabella Mansfield Award to recognize outstanding women lawyers in the state.
- A commemorative sculpture of her was commissioned by Iowa Wesleyan College and installed at the campus; it was created by Benjamin Victor.
- The National Association of Women Lawyers named its most prestigious award after Arabella Babb Mansfield. Past winners include all three sitting female U.S. Supreme Court Justices, Judge Ann Claire Williams (7th Circuit), Anita Hill, and Marcia Greenberger.
- In 2017, Diversity Lab established the Mansfield Rule to hold big law firms accountable for their diversity goals. Named for Arabella Mansfield, the rule is modeled after the National Football League’s Rooney Rule, which requires teams to interview a minority candidate for head coach or general manager vacancies. The idea, first proposed by Mark Helm, a partner at Munger, Tolles & Olson, was to create a system to circumvent implicit biases and encourage big law firms to consider women or minority candidates for leadership roles at the firm. To be considered “Mansfield Certified” by Diversity Lab, a firm needs to show that 30 percent of the candidate pool for these positions were underrepresented lawyers.

== See also ==
- Carrie Chapman Catt, contemporaneous Iowa leader of women's suffrage movement
- List of first women lawyers and judges in the United States
- First women lawyers around the world
- List of suffragists and suffragettes
- Gertrude Rush, Iowa's first African-American lawyer
- Feminism
- History of feminism
