= Herbert Hoover Presidential Library and Museum =

Presidential library and museum for U.S. President Herbert Hoover in West Branch, Iowa

Herbert Hoover Presidential Library
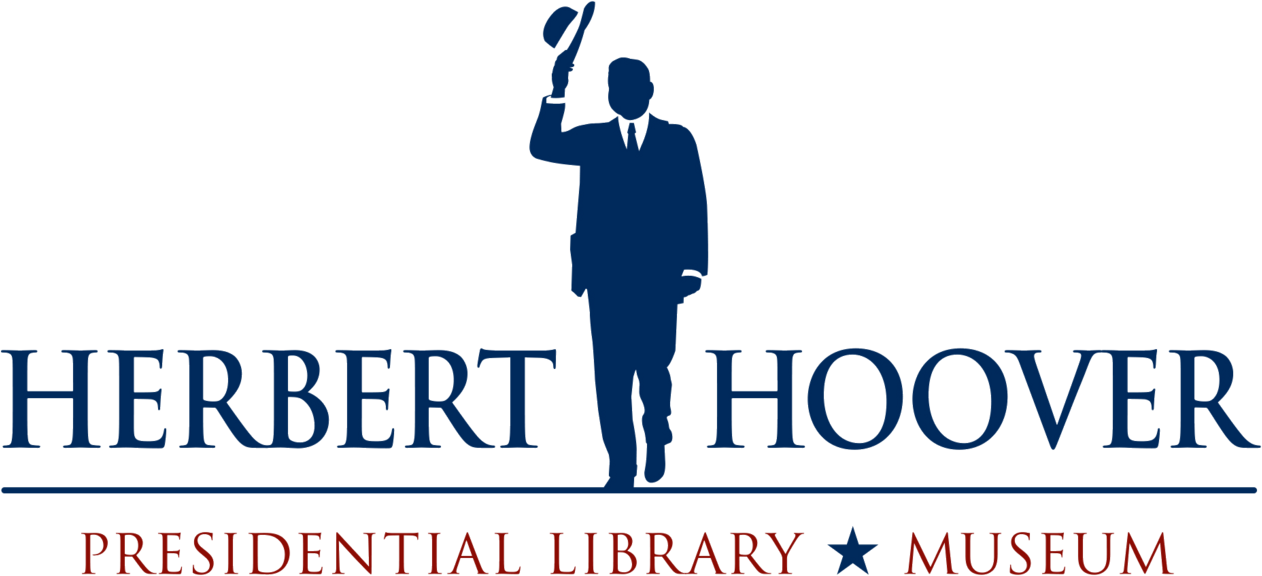

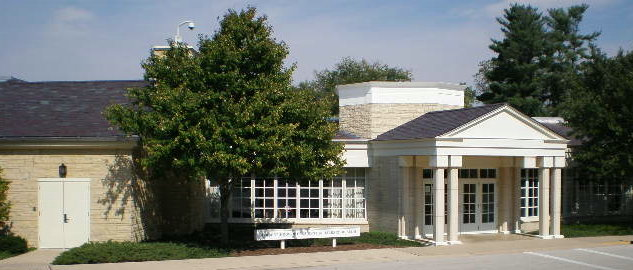
- The Herbert Hoover Presidential Library and Museum in 2007

- Location within Iowa Location within the United States
- Interactive map showing the location of Hoover Presidential Library

General information
- Location: West Branch, Iowa, United States
- Coordinates: 41.669°N 91.348°W
- Inaugurated: Dedicated on August 10, 1962; Rededicated on August 8, 1992
- Operator: National Archives and Records Administration

Technical details
- Size: 47,169 square feet (4,382.1 m^{2})

Website
- hoover.archives.gov

The Herbert Hoover Presidential Library and Museum is the presidential library and burial place of Herbert Hoover, the 31st president of the United States (1929–1933), located on the grounds of the Herbert Hoover National Historic Site in West Branch, Iowa. The library contains approximately 30,000 photographs, 700 video recordings, and 390 audio recordings related to the lives of Herbert and Lou Henry Hoover. The library is one of thirteen presidential libraries run by the National Archives and Records Administration.

== Background ==
In 1954, a group of Hoover's friends incorporated the Herbert Hoover Birthplace Foundation to raise money for the preservation of his birthplace and the area around it, and to plan for improvements to the site. One of their ideas was to build a small museum, and with Hoover's approval work began in the late 1950s. The architectural firm of Eggers and Higgins of New York drew the plans for the original building, a modest limestone structure of just over 4,000 square feet. While the museum at West Branch was still under construction, Hoover decided to expand it and to make it his Presidential Library.

The Library and Museum was officially dedicated and opened to the public on August 10, 1962, Hoover's 88th birthday. Hoover and former President Harry S. Truman were present at the dedication. Hoover began his speech by saying:

When the members of the Congress created these presidential libraries they did a great public service. They made available for research the records of vital periods in American history – and they planted these records in the countryside instead of allowing their concentration on the seaboard.

Already the three libraries of President Roosevelt, President Truman, and President Eisenhower, by their unique documentation, serve this purpose, and today we dedicate a fourth – my own.

Within them are thrilling records of supreme action by the American people, their devotion and sacrifice to their ideals. Santayana rightly said: "Those who do not remember the past are condemned to relive it." These institutions are the repositories of such experience – hot off the griddle.

In these records there are, no doubt, unfavorable remarks made by our political opponents, as well as expressions of appreciation and affection by our friends.

We may hope that future students will rely upon our friends. In any event, when they become sleepy they may be awakened by the lightning flashes of American political humor.

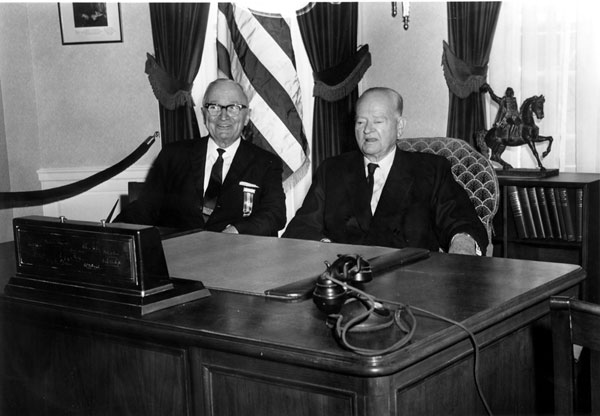
Presidents Harry Truman and Herbert Hoover at the dedication of the Herbert Hoover Presidential Library and Museum on August 10, 1962

The original Library and Museum building was expanded several times, with major additions being completed in 1964, 1971, 1974 and 1992. The architects for the 1964, 1971, and 1974 expansion projects were Wetherell, Harrison & Wagner Associates.

On August 8, 1992, former President Ronald Reagan rededicated the Library and Museum. The rededication was the result of a renovation project that expanded the library to 47,169 square feet (4,382.1 m^{2}). The $6.5-million expansion was a public–private partnership, with Washington supplying $5 million for bricks and mortar, supplementing $1.5 million raised by the Herbert Hoover Presidential Library Association for new exhibits. The architects for the 1992 expansion were HNTB Corp.

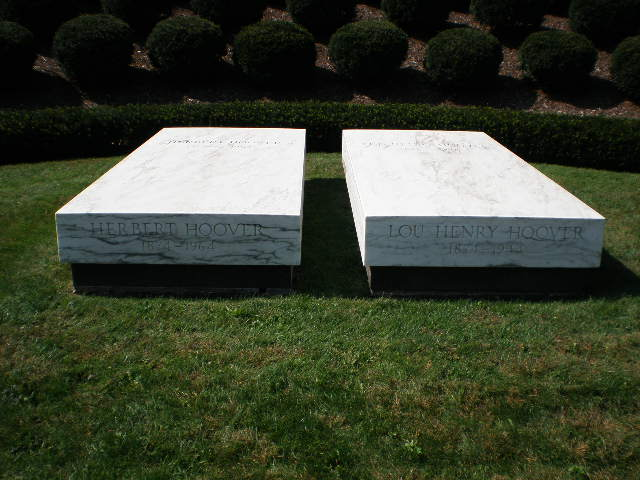
Graves of Herbert Hoover and Lou Henry Hoover

Holding almost 300 collections, the Library is an important center for the study of conservative thought, agricultural economics, famine relief, commercial aviation, political journalism, government efficiency and reorganization, isolationism, and U.S. foreign policy. In addition to the papers of Herbert Hoover, the manuscript holdings include those of Lewis Strauss, Gerald P. Nye, Felix Morley, Clark Mollenhoff, Robert E. Wood, Westbrook Pegler, and Laura Ingalls Wilder, among others.

The Library and Museum is located within the Herbert Hoover National Historic Site, which contains Hoover's birthplace, a reconstruction of Hoover's father's blacksmith shop, a one-room schoolhouse, a Quaker meeting house, and – on a hill overlooking the Library and Museum and Historic Site – the graves of Herbert and Lou Henry Hoover.

== See also ==
- Presidential memorials in the United States
- List of burial places of presidents and vice presidents of the United States
