= Faeth Farmstead and Orchard District =

Historic district in Iowa, United States

- U.S. National Register of Historic Places
- U.S. Historic district
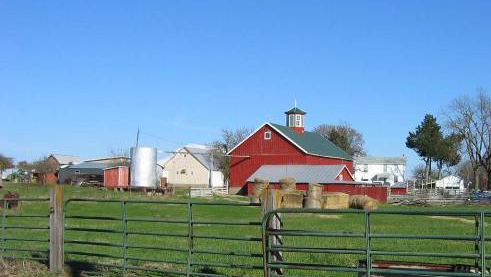

- Location within Iowa Location within the United States
- Location: Jefferson Township, Lee County, Iowa, USA
- Nearest city: Fort Madison, Iowa
- Coordinates: 40°38′11″N 91°26′11″W
- Area: 23 acres (9.3 ha)
- Built: 1873
- Architectural style: Greek Revival; Late Victorian
- NRHP reference No.: 05001020
- Added to NRHP: September 16, 2005

The Faeth Farmstead and Orchard District is a nationally recognized historic district located near Fort Madison, Iowa, United States. At the time of its nomination it contained 27 resources, which included 15 contributing buildings, three contributing sites, three contributing structures, and six non-contributing buildings. The contributing buildings include the farm house (c. 1873), the main barn (1882), a stable (c. 1890–1910), a privy, engine house, smokehouse, chicken house, and hog house all from the early 1900s, a shop/crib (c. 1915), a second barn (1925), an apple packing shed (c. 1942), an apple cold storage shed or cooler with loading dock (c. 1950), a truck shed (late 1940s), a garage (1950s) and a machine shed (c. 1960). The contributing structures include a pond that was used for spraying apples (c. 1936), a spray tank/house (1946), and an old section of road. The contributing sites are the three historic orchards. The East Orchard was established before 1874 and it still has remnant older trees. The Old North Orchard was established around the turn of the 20th century, but the trees were primarily planted in the 1970s and the 1980s. The North Orchard was established in 1940-1941 and includes some remnant older trees and replacement trees from the 1970s to the 1990s. The non-contributing buildings are more recently built, or moved here in recent years.

The farm was founded by German immigrants Jacob and Elizabeth Faeth in 1842. Mormons encamped near the farm after fleeing Nauvoo, Illinois. Adam Faeth built the existing house and barn. Herb Faeth expanded the orchard; he was close friends with the naturalist Aldo Leopold. Faeth Farm was self-supporting, sustainable farm for decades, and is believed to have the oldest orchard west of the Mississippi. In November, 2008, the farm was divided among four different parties, and much of it is likely to be developed. The core of the farmstead might remain orchard, but the property is still considered one of Iowa's most endangered historic sites.
