= Bethel African Methodist Episcopal Church (Cedar Rapids, Iowa) =

- U.S. National Register of Historic Places
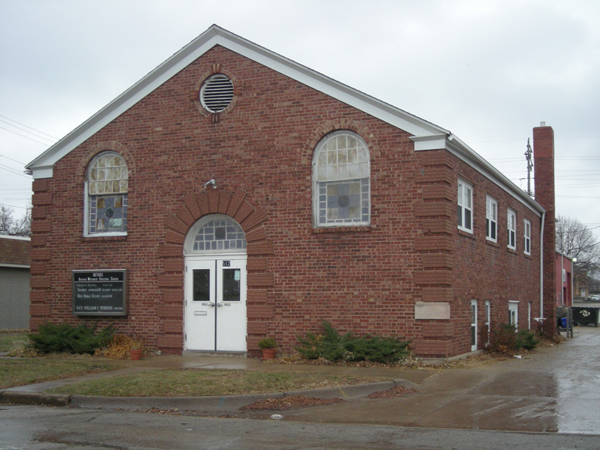

- Location within Iowa Location within the United States
- Location: 512 6th Street, SE; Cedar Rapids, Iowa
- Coordinates: 41°58′39.5″N 91°39′36.6″W
- Area: less than one acre
- Built: 1931
- Architectural style: Colonial Revival
- NRHP reference No.: 13000927
- Added to NRHP: December 18, 2013

Bethel African Methodist Episcopal Church is located in Cedar Rapids, Iowa, United States. The congregation was established in either 1870 or 1871, which makes this the oldest historically African American church in the city. It had 23 pastors from its inception to 1928, which followed the African Methodist Episcopal Church's practice of itinerant pastors. The congregation grew slowly over this same period. Many African Americans came to Cedar Rapids after the coal industry in Southern Iowa began to collapse. The Rev. Benjamin Horace Lucas, who became pastor here in 1928, was also a catalyst for growth in the congregation. Completed in 1931, this brick Colonial Revival structure replaced a wood-frame structure from 1876. Since its completion, it has served the social and religious needs of the community. It is one of the few surviving links to Cedar Rapid's early African American community as this neighborhood has been nearly obliterated by the development of Mercy Medical Center. The church building was listed on the National Register of Historic Places in 2013.

== See also ==
- African-Americans of Cedar Rapids, Iowa
